

39001–39100 

|-bgcolor=#E9E9E9
| 39001 ||  || — || October 24, 2000 || Socorro || LINEAR || ADE || align=right | 7.2 km || 
|-id=002 bgcolor=#fefefe
| 39002 ||  || — || October 18, 2000 || Socorro || LINEAR || — || align=right | 3.0 km || 
|-id=003 bgcolor=#E9E9E9
| 39003 ||  || — || October 24, 2000 || Socorro || LINEAR || — || align=right | 2.8 km || 
|-id=004 bgcolor=#d6d6d6
| 39004 ||  || — || October 24, 2000 || Socorro || LINEAR || — || align=right | 4.8 km || 
|-id=005 bgcolor=#E9E9E9
| 39005 ||  || — || October 24, 2000 || Socorro || LINEAR || — || align=right | 2.1 km || 
|-id=006 bgcolor=#fefefe
| 39006 ||  || — || October 24, 2000 || Socorro || LINEAR || V || align=right | 1.9 km || 
|-id=007 bgcolor=#E9E9E9
| 39007 ||  || — || October 24, 2000 || Socorro || LINEAR || — || align=right | 3.2 km || 
|-id=008 bgcolor=#E9E9E9
| 39008 ||  || — || October 24, 2000 || Socorro || LINEAR || — || align=right | 2.8 km || 
|-id=009 bgcolor=#E9E9E9
| 39009 ||  || — || October 24, 2000 || Socorro || LINEAR || HEN || align=right | 2.6 km || 
|-id=010 bgcolor=#E9E9E9
| 39010 ||  || — || October 24, 2000 || Socorro || LINEAR || WIT || align=right | 2.8 km || 
|-id=011 bgcolor=#d6d6d6
| 39011 ||  || — || October 24, 2000 || Socorro || LINEAR || — || align=right | 9.3 km || 
|-id=012 bgcolor=#E9E9E9
| 39012 ||  || — || October 24, 2000 || Socorro || LINEAR || HOF || align=right | 7.4 km || 
|-id=013 bgcolor=#E9E9E9
| 39013 ||  || — || October 24, 2000 || Socorro || LINEAR || — || align=right | 3.3 km || 
|-id=014 bgcolor=#E9E9E9
| 39014 ||  || — || October 24, 2000 || Socorro || LINEAR || — || align=right | 3.6 km || 
|-id=015 bgcolor=#d6d6d6
| 39015 ||  || — || October 24, 2000 || Socorro || LINEAR || KOR || align=right | 4.7 km || 
|-id=016 bgcolor=#E9E9E9
| 39016 ||  || — || October 24, 2000 || Socorro || LINEAR || — || align=right | 3.2 km || 
|-id=017 bgcolor=#fefefe
| 39017 ||  || — || October 24, 2000 || Socorro || LINEAR || NYS || align=right | 1.8 km || 
|-id=018 bgcolor=#d6d6d6
| 39018 ||  || — || October 24, 2000 || Socorro || LINEAR || 2:1J || align=right | 7.0 km || 
|-id=019 bgcolor=#fefefe
| 39019 ||  || — || October 24, 2000 || Socorro || LINEAR || — || align=right | 2.6 km || 
|-id=020 bgcolor=#E9E9E9
| 39020 ||  || — || October 24, 2000 || Socorro || LINEAR || — || align=right | 3.3 km || 
|-id=021 bgcolor=#fefefe
| 39021 ||  || — || October 24, 2000 || Socorro || LINEAR || — || align=right | 3.4 km || 
|-id=022 bgcolor=#d6d6d6
| 39022 ||  || — || October 24, 2000 || Socorro || LINEAR || — || align=right | 6.5 km || 
|-id=023 bgcolor=#E9E9E9
| 39023 ||  || — || October 24, 2000 || Socorro || LINEAR || — || align=right | 4.5 km || 
|-id=024 bgcolor=#E9E9E9
| 39024 ||  || — || October 25, 2000 || Socorro || LINEAR || — || align=right | 5.1 km || 
|-id=025 bgcolor=#fefefe
| 39025 ||  || — || October 25, 2000 || Socorro || LINEAR || — || align=right | 2.4 km || 
|-id=026 bgcolor=#fefefe
| 39026 ||  || — || October 25, 2000 || Socorro || LINEAR || — || align=right | 1.8 km || 
|-id=027 bgcolor=#fefefe
| 39027 ||  || — || October 25, 2000 || Socorro || LINEAR || FLO || align=right | 2.5 km || 
|-id=028 bgcolor=#E9E9E9
| 39028 ||  || — || October 25, 2000 || Socorro || LINEAR || — || align=right | 2.2 km || 
|-id=029 bgcolor=#E9E9E9
| 39029 ||  || — || October 25, 2000 || Socorro || LINEAR || — || align=right | 2.7 km || 
|-id=030 bgcolor=#E9E9E9
| 39030 ||  || — || October 29, 2000 || Socorro || LINEAR || ADE || align=right | 7.6 km || 
|-id=031 bgcolor=#E9E9E9
| 39031 ||  || — || October 29, 2000 || Socorro || LINEAR || GER || align=right | 2.8 km || 
|-id=032 bgcolor=#d6d6d6
| 39032 ||  || — || October 24, 2000 || Socorro || LINEAR || — || align=right | 5.1 km || 
|-id=033 bgcolor=#fefefe
| 39033 ||  || — || October 24, 2000 || Socorro || LINEAR || V || align=right | 1.3 km || 
|-id=034 bgcolor=#d6d6d6
| 39034 ||  || — || October 24, 2000 || Socorro || LINEAR || HYG || align=right | 7.8 km || 
|-id=035 bgcolor=#E9E9E9
| 39035 ||  || — || October 24, 2000 || Socorro || LINEAR || HOF || align=right | 6.3 km || 
|-id=036 bgcolor=#fefefe
| 39036 ||  || — || October 24, 2000 || Socorro || LINEAR || slow || align=right | 1.8 km || 
|-id=037 bgcolor=#fefefe
| 39037 ||  || — || October 24, 2000 || Socorro || LINEAR || V || align=right | 1.4 km || 
|-id=038 bgcolor=#fefefe
| 39038 ||  || — || October 24, 2000 || Socorro || LINEAR || FLO || align=right | 4.4 km || 
|-id=039 bgcolor=#E9E9E9
| 39039 ||  || — || October 29, 2000 || Socorro || LINEAR || HEN || align=right | 2.4 km || 
|-id=040 bgcolor=#fefefe
| 39040 ||  || — || October 31, 2000 || Socorro || LINEAR || — || align=right | 1.9 km || 
|-id=041 bgcolor=#d6d6d6
| 39041 ||  || — || October 31, 2000 || Socorro || LINEAR || — || align=right | 8.9 km || 
|-id=042 bgcolor=#d6d6d6
| 39042 ||  || — || October 31, 2000 || Socorro || LINEAR || EOS || align=right | 3.8 km || 
|-id=043 bgcolor=#fefefe
| 39043 ||  || — || October 24, 2000 || Socorro || LINEAR || — || align=right | 3.2 km || 
|-id=044 bgcolor=#fefefe
| 39044 ||  || — || October 25, 2000 || Socorro || LINEAR || FLO || align=right | 1.4 km || 
|-id=045 bgcolor=#fefefe
| 39045 ||  || — || October 25, 2000 || Socorro || LINEAR || V || align=right | 2.4 km || 
|-id=046 bgcolor=#E9E9E9
| 39046 ||  || — || October 25, 2000 || Socorro || LINEAR || EUN || align=right | 4.1 km || 
|-id=047 bgcolor=#d6d6d6
| 39047 ||  || — || October 25, 2000 || Socorro || LINEAR || — || align=right | 6.2 km || 
|-id=048 bgcolor=#E9E9E9
| 39048 ||  || — || October 25, 2000 || Socorro || LINEAR || — || align=right | 5.9 km || 
|-id=049 bgcolor=#E9E9E9
| 39049 ||  || — || October 25, 2000 || Socorro || LINEAR || — || align=right | 5.7 km || 
|-id=050 bgcolor=#fefefe
| 39050 ||  || — || October 25, 2000 || Socorro || LINEAR || FLO || align=right | 1.7 km || 
|-id=051 bgcolor=#fefefe
| 39051 ||  || — || October 25, 2000 || Socorro || LINEAR || V || align=right | 2.1 km || 
|-id=052 bgcolor=#d6d6d6
| 39052 ||  || — || October 25, 2000 || Socorro || LINEAR || — || align=right | 10 km || 
|-id=053 bgcolor=#E9E9E9
| 39053 ||  || — || October 25, 2000 || Socorro || LINEAR || — || align=right | 2.2 km || 
|-id=054 bgcolor=#E9E9E9
| 39054 ||  || — || October 25, 2000 || Socorro || LINEAR || PAD || align=right | 6.1 km || 
|-id=055 bgcolor=#d6d6d6
| 39055 ||  || — || October 25, 2000 || Socorro || LINEAR || — || align=right | 5.0 km || 
|-id=056 bgcolor=#d6d6d6
| 39056 ||  || — || October 25, 2000 || Socorro || LINEAR || FIR || align=right | 9.3 km || 
|-id=057 bgcolor=#E9E9E9
| 39057 ||  || — || October 25, 2000 || Socorro || LINEAR || — || align=right | 5.0 km || 
|-id=058 bgcolor=#fefefe
| 39058 ||  || — || October 25, 2000 || Socorro || LINEAR || — || align=right | 2.4 km || 
|-id=059 bgcolor=#fefefe
| 39059 ||  || — || October 29, 2000 || Socorro || LINEAR || — || align=right | 2.4 km || 
|-id=060 bgcolor=#E9E9E9
| 39060 ||  || — || October 29, 2000 || Socorro || LINEAR || WIT || align=right | 2.5 km || 
|-id=061 bgcolor=#fefefe
| 39061 ||  || — || October 31, 2000 || Socorro || LINEAR || — || align=right | 2.7 km || 
|-id=062 bgcolor=#d6d6d6
| 39062 ||  || — || October 31, 2000 || Socorro || LINEAR || — || align=right | 5.7 km || 
|-id=063 bgcolor=#E9E9E9
| 39063 ||  || — || October 26, 2000 || Kitt Peak || Spacewatch || — || align=right | 3.5 km || 
|-id=064 bgcolor=#E9E9E9
| 39064 ||  || — || October 26, 2000 || Kitt Peak || Spacewatch || AGN || align=right | 3.0 km || 
|-id=065 bgcolor=#E9E9E9
| 39065 ||  || — || October 29, 2000 || Kitt Peak || Spacewatch || — || align=right | 4.0 km || 
|-id=066 bgcolor=#E9E9E9
| 39066 ||  || — || October 24, 2000 || Socorro || LINEAR || — || align=right | 3.7 km || 
|-id=067 bgcolor=#fefefe
| 39067 ||  || — || November 1, 2000 || Desert Beaver || W. K. Y. Yeung || — || align=right | 2.5 km || 
|-id=068 bgcolor=#d6d6d6
| 39068 ||  || — || November 1, 2000 || Socorro || LINEAR || THM || align=right | 5.5 km || 
|-id=069 bgcolor=#d6d6d6
| 39069 ||  || — || November 1, 2000 || Socorro || LINEAR || — || align=right | 9.8 km || 
|-id=070 bgcolor=#fefefe
| 39070 ||  || — || November 1, 2000 || Socorro || LINEAR || — || align=right | 2.3 km || 
|-id=071 bgcolor=#fefefe
| 39071 ||  || — || November 1, 2000 || Socorro || LINEAR || — || align=right | 2.0 km || 
|-id=072 bgcolor=#E9E9E9
| 39072 ||  || — || November 1, 2000 || Socorro || LINEAR || — || align=right | 5.5 km || 
|-id=073 bgcolor=#fefefe
| 39073 ||  || — || November 1, 2000 || Socorro || LINEAR || — || align=right | 6.4 km || 
|-id=074 bgcolor=#E9E9E9
| 39074 ||  || — || November 1, 2000 || Socorro || LINEAR || — || align=right | 6.6 km || 
|-id=075 bgcolor=#d6d6d6
| 39075 ||  || — || November 1, 2000 || Socorro || LINEAR || — || align=right | 3.5 km || 
|-id=076 bgcolor=#E9E9E9
| 39076 ||  || — || November 1, 2000 || Socorro || LINEAR || — || align=right | 4.3 km || 
|-id=077 bgcolor=#d6d6d6
| 39077 ||  || — || November 1, 2000 || Socorro || LINEAR || THM || align=right | 6.2 km || 
|-id=078 bgcolor=#fefefe
| 39078 ||  || — || November 1, 2000 || Socorro || LINEAR || — || align=right | 1.7 km || 
|-id=079 bgcolor=#fefefe
| 39079 ||  || — || November 1, 2000 || Socorro || LINEAR || FLO || align=right | 2.0 km || 
|-id=080 bgcolor=#fefefe
| 39080 ||  || — || November 1, 2000 || Socorro || LINEAR || — || align=right | 2.4 km || 
|-id=081 bgcolor=#fefefe
| 39081 ||  || — || November 1, 2000 || Socorro || LINEAR || NYS || align=right | 3.7 km || 
|-id=082 bgcolor=#E9E9E9
| 39082 ||  || — || November 1, 2000 || Socorro || LINEAR || — || align=right | 6.3 km || 
|-id=083 bgcolor=#d6d6d6
| 39083 ||  || — || November 1, 2000 || Socorro || LINEAR || THM || align=right | 5.7 km || 
|-id=084 bgcolor=#E9E9E9
| 39084 ||  || — || November 1, 2000 || Socorro || LINEAR || — || align=right | 5.7 km || 
|-id=085 bgcolor=#d6d6d6
| 39085 ||  || — || November 1, 2000 || Socorro || LINEAR || — || align=right | 10 km || 
|-id=086 bgcolor=#E9E9E9
| 39086 ||  || — || November 1, 2000 || Socorro || LINEAR || — || align=right | 2.3 km || 
|-id=087 bgcolor=#fefefe
| 39087 ||  || — || November 2, 2000 || Socorro || LINEAR || V || align=right | 3.5 km || 
|-id=088 bgcolor=#fefefe
| 39088 ||  || — || November 2, 2000 || Socorro || LINEAR || V || align=right | 2.2 km || 
|-id=089 bgcolor=#E9E9E9
| 39089 ||  || — || November 3, 2000 || Socorro || LINEAR || AGN || align=right | 2.3 km || 
|-id=090 bgcolor=#fefefe
| 39090 ||  || — || November 3, 2000 || Socorro || LINEAR || V || align=right | 2.3 km || 
|-id=091 bgcolor=#fefefe
| 39091 ||  || — || November 3, 2000 || Socorro || LINEAR || ERI || align=right | 5.8 km || 
|-id=092 bgcolor=#E9E9E9
| 39092 ||  || — || November 3, 2000 || Socorro || LINEAR || NEM || align=right | 6.0 km || 
|-id=093 bgcolor=#d6d6d6
| 39093 ||  || — || November 2, 2000 || Socorro || LINEAR || — || align=right | 6.7 km || 
|-id=094 bgcolor=#d6d6d6
| 39094 ||  || — || November 1, 2000 || Socorro || LINEAR || LIX || align=right | 10 km || 
|-id=095 bgcolor=#fefefe
| 39095 ||  || — || November 3, 2000 || Socorro || LINEAR || — || align=right | 1.8 km || 
|-id=096 bgcolor=#FA8072
| 39096 ||  || — || November 17, 2000 || Socorro || LINEAR || — || align=right | 4.1 km || 
|-id=097 bgcolor=#fefefe
| 39097 ||  || — || November 20, 2000 || Socorro || LINEAR || V || align=right | 1.5 km || 
|-id=098 bgcolor=#E9E9E9
| 39098 ||  || — || November 22, 2000 || Haleakala || NEAT || GEF || align=right | 2.3 km || 
|-id=099 bgcolor=#E9E9E9
| 39099 ||  || — || November 22, 2000 || Haleakala || NEAT || RAF || align=right | 4.1 km || 
|-id=100 bgcolor=#E9E9E9
| 39100 ||  || — || November 20, 2000 || Socorro || LINEAR || HEN || align=right | 2.1 km || 
|}

39101–39200 

|-bgcolor=#E9E9E9
| 39101 ||  || — || November 20, 2000 || Socorro || LINEAR || — || align=right | 3.6 km || 
|-id=102 bgcolor=#d6d6d6
| 39102 ||  || — || November 21, 2000 || Socorro || LINEAR || — || align=right | 6.6 km || 
|-id=103 bgcolor=#d6d6d6
| 39103 ||  || — || November 21, 2000 || Socorro || LINEAR || — || align=right | 8.1 km || 
|-id=104 bgcolor=#d6d6d6
| 39104 ||  || — || November 21, 2000 || Socorro || LINEAR || THM || align=right | 7.1 km || 
|-id=105 bgcolor=#d6d6d6
| 39105 ||  || — || November 21, 2000 || Socorro || LINEAR || TIR || align=right | 6.0 km || 
|-id=106 bgcolor=#E9E9E9
| 39106 ||  || — || November 20, 2000 || Socorro || LINEAR || — || align=right | 5.5 km || 
|-id=107 bgcolor=#fefefe
| 39107 ||  || — || November 20, 2000 || Socorro || LINEAR || — || align=right | 3.8 km || 
|-id=108 bgcolor=#fefefe
| 39108 ||  || — || November 21, 2000 || Socorro || LINEAR || — || align=right | 3.1 km || 
|-id=109 bgcolor=#E9E9E9
| 39109 ||  || — || November 22, 2000 || Kitt Peak || Spacewatch || — || align=right | 3.3 km || 
|-id=110 bgcolor=#E9E9E9
| 39110 ||  || — || November 23, 2000 || Haleakala || NEAT || — || align=right | 1.6 km || 
|-id=111 bgcolor=#fefefe
| 39111 ||  || — || November 20, 2000 || Socorro || LINEAR || FLO || align=right | 2.4 km || 
|-id=112 bgcolor=#E9E9E9
| 39112 ||  || — || November 20, 2000 || Socorro || LINEAR || EUN || align=right | 4.1 km || 
|-id=113 bgcolor=#E9E9E9
| 39113 ||  || — || November 20, 2000 || Socorro || LINEAR || — || align=right | 4.2 km || 
|-id=114 bgcolor=#E9E9E9
| 39114 ||  || — || November 20, 2000 || Socorro || LINEAR || MRX || align=right | 2.6 km || 
|-id=115 bgcolor=#E9E9E9
| 39115 ||  || — || November 20, 2000 || Socorro || LINEAR || PAD || align=right | 5.3 km || 
|-id=116 bgcolor=#d6d6d6
| 39116 ||  || — || November 20, 2000 || Socorro || LINEAR || — || align=right | 8.6 km || 
|-id=117 bgcolor=#E9E9E9
| 39117 ||  || — || November 20, 2000 || Socorro || LINEAR || — || align=right | 2.9 km || 
|-id=118 bgcolor=#d6d6d6
| 39118 ||  || — || November 20, 2000 || Socorro || LINEAR || EOS || align=right | 5.8 km || 
|-id=119 bgcolor=#E9E9E9
| 39119 ||  || — || November 20, 2000 || Socorro || LINEAR || — || align=right | 3.1 km || 
|-id=120 bgcolor=#E9E9E9
| 39120 ||  || — || November 20, 2000 || Socorro || LINEAR || — || align=right | 3.1 km || 
|-id=121 bgcolor=#fefefe
| 39121 ||  || — || November 20, 2000 || Socorro || LINEAR || V || align=right | 3.3 km || 
|-id=122 bgcolor=#E9E9E9
| 39122 ||  || — || November 21, 2000 || Socorro || LINEAR || — || align=right | 3.1 km || 
|-id=123 bgcolor=#E9E9E9
| 39123 ||  || — || November 21, 2000 || Socorro || LINEAR || HEN || align=right | 2.9 km || 
|-id=124 bgcolor=#d6d6d6
| 39124 ||  || — || November 21, 2000 || Socorro || LINEAR || NAE || align=right | 5.7 km || 
|-id=125 bgcolor=#fefefe
| 39125 ||  || — || November 21, 2000 || Socorro || LINEAR || NYS || align=right | 2.3 km || 
|-id=126 bgcolor=#d6d6d6
| 39126 ||  || — || November 21, 2000 || Socorro || LINEAR || — || align=right | 8.5 km || 
|-id=127 bgcolor=#E9E9E9
| 39127 ||  || — || November 21, 2000 || Socorro || LINEAR || — || align=right | 2.3 km || 
|-id=128 bgcolor=#d6d6d6
| 39128 ||  || — || November 21, 2000 || Socorro || LINEAR || — || align=right | 6.2 km || 
|-id=129 bgcolor=#E9E9E9
| 39129 ||  || — || November 27, 2000 || Kitt Peak || Spacewatch || — || align=right | 4.3 km || 
|-id=130 bgcolor=#E9E9E9
| 39130 ||  || — || November 21, 2000 || Socorro || LINEAR || — || align=right | 2.7 km || 
|-id=131 bgcolor=#E9E9E9
| 39131 ||  || — || November 21, 2000 || Socorro || LINEAR || — || align=right | 2.9 km || 
|-id=132 bgcolor=#d6d6d6
| 39132 ||  || — || November 21, 2000 || Socorro || LINEAR || TIR || align=right | 4.8 km || 
|-id=133 bgcolor=#E9E9E9
| 39133 ||  || — || November 21, 2000 || Socorro || LINEAR || — || align=right | 5.9 km || 
|-id=134 bgcolor=#E9E9E9
| 39134 ||  || — || November 21, 2000 || Socorro || LINEAR || — || align=right | 2.6 km || 
|-id=135 bgcolor=#d6d6d6
| 39135 ||  || — || November 21, 2000 || Socorro || LINEAR || — || align=right | 11 km || 
|-id=136 bgcolor=#E9E9E9
| 39136 ||  || — || November 21, 2000 || Socorro || LINEAR || — || align=right | 5.8 km || 
|-id=137 bgcolor=#d6d6d6
| 39137 ||  || — || November 26, 2000 || Desert Beaver || W. K. Y. Yeung || EOS || align=right | 5.4 km || 
|-id=138 bgcolor=#E9E9E9
| 39138 ||  || — || November 19, 2000 || Socorro || LINEAR || — || align=right | 4.4 km || 
|-id=139 bgcolor=#fefefe
| 39139 ||  || — || November 19, 2000 || Socorro || LINEAR || — || align=right | 3.0 km || 
|-id=140 bgcolor=#fefefe
| 39140 ||  || — || November 20, 2000 || Socorro || LINEAR || — || align=right | 2.3 km || 
|-id=141 bgcolor=#E9E9E9
| 39141 ||  || — || November 20, 2000 || Socorro || LINEAR || — || align=right | 5.8 km || 
|-id=142 bgcolor=#E9E9E9
| 39142 ||  || — || November 20, 2000 || Socorro || LINEAR || — || align=right | 2.6 km || 
|-id=143 bgcolor=#E9E9E9
| 39143 ||  || — || November 20, 2000 || Socorro || LINEAR || — || align=right | 3.8 km || 
|-id=144 bgcolor=#fefefe
| 39144 ||  || — || November 20, 2000 || Socorro || LINEAR || NYS || align=right | 4.0 km || 
|-id=145 bgcolor=#d6d6d6
| 39145 ||  || — || November 21, 2000 || Socorro || LINEAR || KOR || align=right | 3.6 km || 
|-id=146 bgcolor=#d6d6d6
| 39146 ||  || — || November 21, 2000 || Socorro || LINEAR || — || align=right | 8.4 km || 
|-id=147 bgcolor=#d6d6d6
| 39147 ||  || — || November 21, 2000 || Socorro || LINEAR || HYG || align=right | 6.6 km || 
|-id=148 bgcolor=#E9E9E9
| 39148 ||  || — || November 21, 2000 || Socorro || LINEAR || MAR || align=right | 4.1 km || 
|-id=149 bgcolor=#d6d6d6
| 39149 ||  || — || November 21, 2000 || Socorro || LINEAR || — || align=right | 8.1 km || 
|-id=150 bgcolor=#fefefe
| 39150 ||  || — || November 21, 2000 || Socorro || LINEAR || NYS || align=right | 2.8 km || 
|-id=151 bgcolor=#E9E9E9
| 39151 ||  || — || November 21, 2000 || Socorro || LINEAR || — || align=right | 3.8 km || 
|-id=152 bgcolor=#E9E9E9
| 39152 ||  || — || November 26, 2000 || Socorro || LINEAR || — || align=right | 5.7 km || 
|-id=153 bgcolor=#fefefe
| 39153 ||  || — || November 26, 2000 || Socorro || LINEAR || V || align=right | 3.4 km || 
|-id=154 bgcolor=#fefefe
| 39154 ||  || — || November 26, 2000 || Socorro || LINEAR || — || align=right | 2.4 km || 
|-id=155 bgcolor=#fefefe
| 39155 ||  || — || November 26, 2000 || Socorro || LINEAR || — || align=right | 2.8 km || 
|-id=156 bgcolor=#fefefe
| 39156 ||  || — || November 20, 2000 || Socorro || LINEAR || FLO || align=right | 3.4 km || 
|-id=157 bgcolor=#E9E9E9
| 39157 ||  || — || November 20, 2000 || Socorro || LINEAR || — || align=right | 2.2 km || 
|-id=158 bgcolor=#fefefe
| 39158 ||  || — || November 20, 2000 || Socorro || LINEAR || V || align=right | 2.5 km || 
|-id=159 bgcolor=#d6d6d6
| 39159 ||  || — || November 20, 2000 || Socorro || LINEAR || HYG || align=right | 6.7 km || 
|-id=160 bgcolor=#d6d6d6
| 39160 ||  || — || November 20, 2000 || Socorro || LINEAR || — || align=right | 12 km || 
|-id=161 bgcolor=#fefefe
| 39161 ||  || — || November 20, 2000 || Socorro || LINEAR || — || align=right | 3.0 km || 
|-id=162 bgcolor=#E9E9E9
| 39162 ||  || — || November 20, 2000 || Socorro || LINEAR || — || align=right | 3.9 km || 
|-id=163 bgcolor=#d6d6d6
| 39163 ||  || — || November 20, 2000 || Socorro || LINEAR || — || align=right | 9.3 km || 
|-id=164 bgcolor=#E9E9E9
| 39164 ||  || — || November 29, 2000 || Socorro || LINEAR || — || align=right | 3.7 km || 
|-id=165 bgcolor=#fefefe
| 39165 ||  || — || November 19, 2000 || Kitt Peak || Spacewatch || MAS || align=right | 2.2 km || 
|-id=166 bgcolor=#E9E9E9
| 39166 ||  || — || November 20, 2000 || Kitt Peak || Spacewatch || — || align=right | 2.3 km || 
|-id=167 bgcolor=#d6d6d6
| 39167 Opitom ||  ||  || November 20, 2000 || Anderson Mesa || LONEOS || THM || align=right | 6.1 km || 
|-id=168 bgcolor=#d6d6d6
| 39168 ||  || — || November 20, 2000 || Anderson Mesa || LONEOS || KOR || align=right | 3.4 km || 
|-id=169 bgcolor=#E9E9E9
| 39169 ||  || — || November 19, 2000 || Socorro || LINEAR || — || align=right | 3.1 km || 
|-id=170 bgcolor=#d6d6d6
| 39170 ||  || — || November 21, 2000 || Socorro || LINEAR || KOR || align=right | 3.4 km || 
|-id=171 bgcolor=#d6d6d6
| 39171 ||  || — || November 22, 2000 || Haleakala || NEAT || — || align=right | 6.9 km || 
|-id=172 bgcolor=#E9E9E9
| 39172 ||  || — || November 29, 2000 || Haleakala || NEAT || — || align=right | 7.0 km || 
|-id=173 bgcolor=#E9E9E9
| 39173 ||  || — || November 29, 2000 || Haleakala || NEAT || GEF || align=right | 3.5 km || 
|-id=174 bgcolor=#fefefe
| 39174 ||  || — || November 27, 2000 || Socorro || LINEAR || — || align=right | 2.2 km || 
|-id=175 bgcolor=#fefefe
| 39175 ||  || — || November 30, 2000 || Socorro || LINEAR || — || align=right | 3.0 km || 
|-id=176 bgcolor=#fefefe
| 39176 ||  || — || November 30, 2000 || Socorro || LINEAR || — || align=right | 2.8 km || 
|-id=177 bgcolor=#fefefe
| 39177 ||  || — || November 30, 2000 || Socorro || LINEAR || V || align=right | 3.1 km || 
|-id=178 bgcolor=#E9E9E9
| 39178 ||  || — || November 30, 2000 || Socorro || LINEAR || — || align=right | 4.9 km || 
|-id=179 bgcolor=#d6d6d6
| 39179 ||  || — || November 30, 2000 || Haleakala || NEAT || EOS || align=right | 4.0 km || 
|-id=180 bgcolor=#E9E9E9
| 39180 ||  || — || November 20, 2000 || Anderson Mesa || LONEOS || — || align=right | 5.0 km || 
|-id=181 bgcolor=#E9E9E9
| 39181 ||  || — || November 20, 2000 || Anderson Mesa || LONEOS || GEF || align=right | 3.2 km || 
|-id=182 bgcolor=#fefefe
| 39182 ||  || — || November 21, 2000 || Socorro || LINEAR || — || align=right | 2.4 km || 
|-id=183 bgcolor=#E9E9E9
| 39183 ||  || — || November 22, 2000 || Haleakala || NEAT || — || align=right | 3.5 km || 
|-id=184 bgcolor=#E9E9E9
| 39184 Willgrundy ||  ||  || November 24, 2000 || Anderson Mesa || LONEOS || HOF || align=right | 5.5 km || 
|-id=185 bgcolor=#E9E9E9
| 39185 ||  || — || November 24, 2000 || Anderson Mesa || LONEOS || — || align=right | 5.0 km || 
|-id=186 bgcolor=#E9E9E9
| 39186 ||  || — || November 25, 2000 || Kitt Peak || Spacewatch || — || align=right | 5.2 km || 
|-id=187 bgcolor=#d6d6d6
| 39187 ||  || — || November 26, 2000 || Socorro || LINEAR || BRA || align=right | 3.8 km || 
|-id=188 bgcolor=#E9E9E9
| 39188 ||  || — || November 25, 2000 || Socorro || LINEAR || — || align=right | 3.5 km || 
|-id=189 bgcolor=#d6d6d6
| 39189 ||  || — || November 25, 2000 || Socorro || LINEAR || — || align=right | 5.5 km || 
|-id=190 bgcolor=#fefefe
| 39190 ||  || — || November 26, 2000 || Socorro || LINEAR || — || align=right | 3.1 km || 
|-id=191 bgcolor=#fefefe
| 39191 ||  || — || November 30, 2000 || Anderson Mesa || LONEOS || KLI || align=right | 5.3 km || 
|-id=192 bgcolor=#d6d6d6
| 39192 ||  || — || November 27, 2000 || Socorro || LINEAR || — || align=right | 9.7 km || 
|-id=193 bgcolor=#E9E9E9
| 39193 ||  || — || November 18, 2000 || Anderson Mesa || LONEOS || — || align=right | 3.2 km || 
|-id=194 bgcolor=#d6d6d6
| 39194 ||  || — || November 18, 2000 || Anderson Mesa || LONEOS || — || align=right | 11 km || 
|-id=195 bgcolor=#fefefe
| 39195 ||  || — || November 18, 2000 || Anderson Mesa || LONEOS || FLO || align=right | 1.6 km || 
|-id=196 bgcolor=#E9E9E9
| 39196 ||  || — || November 19, 2000 || Anderson Mesa || LONEOS || — || align=right | 2.6 km || 
|-id=197 bgcolor=#fefefe
| 39197 || 2000 XA || — || December 1, 2000 || Haleakala || NEAT || H || align=right | 3.5 km || 
|-id=198 bgcolor=#E9E9E9
| 39198 ||  || — || December 1, 2000 || Socorro || LINEAR || — || align=right | 8.5 km || 
|-id=199 bgcolor=#d6d6d6
| 39199 ||  || — || December 1, 2000 || Socorro || LINEAR || ALA || align=right | 10 km || 
|-id=200 bgcolor=#E9E9E9
| 39200 ||  || — || December 4, 2000 || Socorro || LINEAR || — || align=right | 6.0 km || 
|}

39201–39300 

|-bgcolor=#fefefe
| 39201 ||  || — || December 4, 2000 || Socorro || LINEAR || V || align=right | 2.1 km || 
|-id=202 bgcolor=#E9E9E9
| 39202 ||  || — || December 4, 2000 || Socorro || LINEAR || EUN || align=right | 5.2 km || 
|-id=203 bgcolor=#E9E9E9
| 39203 ||  || — || December 4, 2000 || Socorro || LINEAR || MAR || align=right | 3.7 km || 
|-id=204 bgcolor=#fefefe
| 39204 ||  || — || December 4, 2000 || Socorro || LINEAR || — || align=right | 2.6 km || 
|-id=205 bgcolor=#E9E9E9
| 39205 ||  || — || December 4, 2000 || Socorro || LINEAR || — || align=right | 3.1 km || 
|-id=206 bgcolor=#E9E9E9
| 39206 ||  || — || December 4, 2000 || Socorro || LINEAR || — || align=right | 4.4 km || 
|-id=207 bgcolor=#E9E9E9
| 39207 ||  || — || December 4, 2000 || Socorro || LINEAR || — || align=right | 4.6 km || 
|-id=208 bgcolor=#d6d6d6
| 39208 ||  || — || December 4, 2000 || Socorro || LINEAR || — || align=right | 8.5 km || 
|-id=209 bgcolor=#d6d6d6
| 39209 ||  || — || December 4, 2000 || Socorro || LINEAR || — || align=right | 7.5 km || 
|-id=210 bgcolor=#fefefe
| 39210 ||  || — || December 4, 2000 || Socorro || LINEAR || — || align=right | 3.1 km || 
|-id=211 bgcolor=#d6d6d6
| 39211 ||  || — || December 4, 2000 || Socorro || LINEAR || EOS || align=right | 5.2 km || 
|-id=212 bgcolor=#d6d6d6
| 39212 ||  || — || December 5, 2000 || Socorro || LINEAR || TIR || align=right | 13 km || 
|-id=213 bgcolor=#d6d6d6
| 39213 ||  || — || December 5, 2000 || Socorro || LINEAR || — || align=right | 7.2 km || 
|-id=214 bgcolor=#d6d6d6
| 39214 ||  || — || December 5, 2000 || Socorro || LINEAR || — || align=right | 5.6 km || 
|-id=215 bgcolor=#E9E9E9
| 39215 ||  || — || December 7, 2000 || Socorro || LINEAR || — || align=right | 6.7 km || 
|-id=216 bgcolor=#d6d6d6
| 39216 ||  || — || December 4, 2000 || Socorro || LINEAR || EOS || align=right | 4.4 km || 
|-id=217 bgcolor=#d6d6d6
| 39217 ||  || — || December 4, 2000 || Socorro || LINEAR || SAN || align=right | 5.8 km || 
|-id=218 bgcolor=#fefefe
| 39218 ||  || — || December 18, 2000 || Kitt Peak || Spacewatch || V || align=right | 3.5 km || 
|-id=219 bgcolor=#E9E9E9
| 39219 ||  || — || December 20, 2000 || Kitt Peak || Spacewatch || — || align=right | 3.3 km || 
|-id=220 bgcolor=#E9E9E9
| 39220 ||  || — || December 19, 2000 || Haleakala || NEAT || — || align=right | 3.1 km || 
|-id=221 bgcolor=#E9E9E9
| 39221 ||  || — || December 20, 2000 || Ondřejov || P. Kušnirák, P. Pravec || AGN || align=right | 2.7 km || 
|-id=222 bgcolor=#fefefe
| 39222 ||  || — || December 20, 2000 || Socorro || LINEAR || V || align=right | 1.7 km || 
|-id=223 bgcolor=#fefefe
| 39223 ||  || — || December 28, 2000 || Kitt Peak || Spacewatch || NYS || align=right | 1.6 km || 
|-id=224 bgcolor=#E9E9E9
| 39224 ||  || — || December 24, 2000 || Anderson Mesa || LONEOS || — || align=right | 3.5 km || 
|-id=225 bgcolor=#E9E9E9
| 39225 ||  || — || December 23, 2000 || Socorro || LINEAR || — || align=right | 5.1 km || 
|-id=226 bgcolor=#fefefe
| 39226 ||  || — || December 23, 2000 || Socorro || LINEAR || — || align=right | 2.6 km || 
|-id=227 bgcolor=#E9E9E9
| 39227 ||  || — || December 28, 2000 || Socorro || LINEAR || — || align=right | 5.2 km || 
|-id=228 bgcolor=#E9E9E9
| 39228 ||  || — || December 29, 2000 || Ondřejov || P. Kušnirák || MIT || align=right | 6.5 km || 
|-id=229 bgcolor=#C2FFFF
| 39229 ||  || — || December 31, 2000 || Haleakala || NEAT || L4 || align=right | 16 km || 
|-id=230 bgcolor=#fefefe
| 39230 ||  || — || December 30, 2000 || Socorro || LINEAR || NYS || align=right | 2.8 km || 
|-id=231 bgcolor=#d6d6d6
| 39231 ||  || — || December 30, 2000 || Socorro || LINEAR || — || align=right | 9.1 km || 
|-id=232 bgcolor=#fefefe
| 39232 ||  || — || December 30, 2000 || Socorro || LINEAR || — || align=right | 3.0 km || 
|-id=233 bgcolor=#d6d6d6
| 39233 ||  || — || December 30, 2000 || Socorro || LINEAR || JLI || align=right | 8.7 km || 
|-id=234 bgcolor=#d6d6d6
| 39234 ||  || — || December 30, 2000 || Socorro || LINEAR || THM || align=right | 8.5 km || 
|-id=235 bgcolor=#FA8072
| 39235 ||  || — || December 30, 2000 || Socorro || LINEAR || — || align=right | 3.9 km || 
|-id=236 bgcolor=#fefefe
| 39236 ||  || — || December 30, 2000 || Socorro || LINEAR || — || align=right | 3.2 km || 
|-id=237 bgcolor=#E9E9E9
| 39237 ||  || — || December 30, 2000 || Socorro || LINEAR || — || align=right | 9.2 km || 
|-id=238 bgcolor=#d6d6d6
| 39238 ||  || — || December 30, 2000 || Socorro || LINEAR || — || align=right | 7.8 km || 
|-id=239 bgcolor=#E9E9E9
| 39239 ||  || — || December 30, 2000 || Socorro || LINEAR || HOF || align=right | 7.6 km || 
|-id=240 bgcolor=#E9E9E9
| 39240 ||  || — || December 30, 2000 || Socorro || LINEAR || WITslow? || align=right | 3.5 km || 
|-id=241 bgcolor=#E9E9E9
| 39241 ||  || — || December 30, 2000 || Socorro || LINEAR || — || align=right | 5.7 km || 
|-id=242 bgcolor=#E9E9E9
| 39242 ||  || — || December 30, 2000 || Socorro || LINEAR || — || align=right | 3.7 km || 
|-id=243 bgcolor=#d6d6d6
| 39243 ||  || — || December 30, 2000 || Socorro || LINEAR || EOS || align=right | 5.4 km || 
|-id=244 bgcolor=#d6d6d6
| 39244 ||  || — || December 30, 2000 || Socorro || LINEAR || — || align=right | 9.0 km || 
|-id=245 bgcolor=#E9E9E9
| 39245 ||  || — || December 30, 2000 || Socorro || LINEAR || — || align=right | 5.3 km || 
|-id=246 bgcolor=#fefefe
| 39246 ||  || — || December 30, 2000 || Socorro || LINEAR || NYS || align=right | 2.2 km || 
|-id=247 bgcolor=#d6d6d6
| 39247 ||  || — || December 30, 2000 || Socorro || LINEAR || — || align=right | 10 km || 
|-id=248 bgcolor=#d6d6d6
| 39248 ||  || — || December 30, 2000 || Socorro || LINEAR || — || align=right | 6.0 km || 
|-id=249 bgcolor=#d6d6d6
| 39249 ||  || — || December 30, 2000 || Socorro || LINEAR || — || align=right | 11 km || 
|-id=250 bgcolor=#d6d6d6
| 39250 ||  || — || December 30, 2000 || Socorro || LINEAR || — || align=right | 8.1 km || 
|-id=251 bgcolor=#d6d6d6
| 39251 ||  || — || December 30, 2000 || Socorro || LINEAR || EOS || align=right | 4.5 km || 
|-id=252 bgcolor=#d6d6d6
| 39252 ||  || — || December 28, 2000 || Socorro || LINEAR || — || align=right | 9.5 km || 
|-id=253 bgcolor=#fefefe
| 39253 ||  || — || December 30, 2000 || Socorro || LINEAR || FLO || align=right | 3.1 km || 
|-id=254 bgcolor=#fefefe
| 39254 ||  || — || December 30, 2000 || Socorro || LINEAR || — || align=right | 3.6 km || 
|-id=255 bgcolor=#fefefe
| 39255 ||  || — || December 30, 2000 || Anderson Mesa || LONEOS || V || align=right | 2.6 km || 
|-id=256 bgcolor=#fefefe
| 39256 Zacny ||  ||  || December 19, 2000 || Anderson Mesa || LONEOS || H || align=right | 1.3 km || 
|-id=257 bgcolor=#E9E9E9
| 39257 ||  || — || December 28, 2000 || Socorro || LINEAR || — || align=right | 3.0 km || 
|-id=258 bgcolor=#E9E9E9
| 39258 ||  || — || December 17, 2000 || Anderson Mesa || LONEOS || — || align=right | 4.1 km || 
|-id=259 bgcolor=#d6d6d6
| 39259 ||  || — || December 23, 2000 || Socorro || LINEAR || — || align=right | 7.4 km || 
|-id=260 bgcolor=#d6d6d6
| 39260 ||  || — || December 26, 2000 || Haleakala || NEAT || LIX || align=right | 9.8 km || 
|-id=261 bgcolor=#d6d6d6
| 39261 ||  || — || December 26, 2000 || Haleakala || NEAT || — || align=right | 4.4 km || 
|-id=262 bgcolor=#fefefe
| 39262 ||  || — || December 26, 2000 || Haleakala || NEAT || PHO || align=right | 5.0 km || 
|-id=263 bgcolor=#d6d6d6
| 39263 ||  || — || December 27, 2000 || Anderson Mesa || LONEOS || — || align=right | 16 km || 
|-id=264 bgcolor=#C2FFFF
| 39264 ||  || — || December 27, 2000 || Anderson Mesa || LONEOS || L4 || align=right | 36 km || 
|-id=265 bgcolor=#fefefe
| 39265 ||  || — || January 3, 2001 || Perth Observatory || J. Biggs || — || align=right | 3.6 km || 
|-id=266 bgcolor=#d6d6d6
| 39266 ||  || — || January 1, 2001 || Kitt Peak || Spacewatch || 3:2 || align=right | 16 km || 
|-id=267 bgcolor=#d6d6d6
| 39267 ||  || — || January 2, 2001 || Socorro || LINEAR || — || align=right | 9.9 km || 
|-id=268 bgcolor=#d6d6d6
| 39268 ||  || — || January 2, 2001 || Socorro || LINEAR || EOS || align=right | 6.5 km || 
|-id=269 bgcolor=#d6d6d6
| 39269 ||  || — || January 2, 2001 || Socorro || LINEAR || — || align=right | 5.0 km || 
|-id=270 bgcolor=#C2FFFF
| 39270 ||  || — || January 2, 2001 || Socorro || LINEAR || L4 || align=right | 20 km || 
|-id=271 bgcolor=#E9E9E9
| 39271 ||  || — || January 3, 2001 || Socorro || LINEAR || ADE || align=right | 7.1 km || 
|-id=272 bgcolor=#d6d6d6
| 39272 ||  || — || January 3, 2001 || Socorro || LINEAR || EOS || align=right | 6.1 km || 
|-id=273 bgcolor=#d6d6d6
| 39273 ||  || — || January 4, 2001 || Socorro || LINEAR || — || align=right | 12 km || 
|-id=274 bgcolor=#fefefe
| 39274 ||  || — || January 4, 2001 || Socorro || LINEAR || — || align=right | 2.7 km || 
|-id=275 bgcolor=#C2FFFF
| 39275 ||  || — || January 5, 2001 || Socorro || LINEAR || L4 || align=right | 21 km || 
|-id=276 bgcolor=#d6d6d6
| 39276 ||  || — || January 3, 2001 || Anderson Mesa || LONEOS || — || align=right | 9.0 km || 
|-id=277 bgcolor=#fefefe
| 39277 ||  || — || January 19, 2001 || Socorro || LINEAR || V || align=right | 2.1 km || 
|-id=278 bgcolor=#C2FFFF
| 39278 ||  || — || January 19, 2001 || Socorro || LINEAR || L4 || align=right | 20 km || 
|-id=279 bgcolor=#E9E9E9
| 39279 ||  || — || January 20, 2001 || Socorro || LINEAR || — || align=right | 2.6 km || 
|-id=280 bgcolor=#C2FFFF
| 39280 ||  || — || January 20, 2001 || Socorro || LINEAR || L4 || align=right | 22 km || 
|-id=281 bgcolor=#d6d6d6
| 39281 ||  || — || January 19, 2001 || Socorro || LINEAR || — || align=right | 8.4 km || 
|-id=282 bgcolor=#d6d6d6
| 39282 ||  || — || January 20, 2001 || Socorro || LINEAR || HIL3:2 || align=right | 19 km || 
|-id=283 bgcolor=#E9E9E9
| 39283 ||  || — || January 21, 2001 || Socorro || LINEAR || EUN || align=right | 3.2 km || 
|-id=284 bgcolor=#C2FFFF
| 39284 ||  || — || January 26, 2001 || Socorro || LINEAR || L4 || align=right | 17 km || 
|-id=285 bgcolor=#C2FFFF
| 39285 Kipkeino ||  ||  || January 26, 2001 || Kitt Peak || Spacewatch || L4ERY || align=right | 18 km || 
|-id=286 bgcolor=#C2FFFF
| 39286 ||  || — || February 1, 2001 || Socorro || LINEAR || L4 || align=right | 21 km || 
|-id=287 bgcolor=#C2FFFF
| 39287 ||  || — || February 1, 2001 || Socorro || LINEAR || L4 || align=right | 13 km || 
|-id=288 bgcolor=#C2FFFF
| 39288 ||  || — || February 2, 2001 || Socorro || LINEAR || L4 || align=right | 17 km || 
|-id=289 bgcolor=#C2FFFF
| 39289 ||  || — || February 2, 2001 || Anderson Mesa || LONEOS || L4 || align=right | 13 km || 
|-id=290 bgcolor=#d6d6d6
| 39290 Landsman ||  ||  || February 2, 2001 || Anderson Mesa || LONEOS || VER || align=right | 12 km || 
|-id=291 bgcolor=#E9E9E9
| 39291 || 2001 DG || — || February 16, 2001 || Desert Beaver || W. K. Y. Yeung || — || align=right | 3.3 km || 
|-id=292 bgcolor=#C2FFFF
| 39292 ||  || — || February 16, 2001 || Socorro || LINEAR || L4 || align=right | 17 km || 
|-id=293 bgcolor=#C2FFFF
| 39293 ||  || — || February 17, 2001 || Socorro || LINEAR || L4 || align=right | 22 km || 
|-id=294 bgcolor=#d6d6d6
| 39294 ||  || — || February 17, 2001 || Socorro || LINEAR || 3:2 || align=right | 19 km || 
|-id=295 bgcolor=#d6d6d6
| 39295 ||  || — || February 18, 2001 || Haleakala || NEAT || — || align=right | 8.2 km || 
|-id=296 bgcolor=#E9E9E9
| 39296 ||  || — || March 2, 2001 || Anderson Mesa || LONEOS || — || align=right | 2.4 km || 
|-id=297 bgcolor=#E9E9E9
| 39297 ||  || — || March 18, 2001 || Socorro || LINEAR || HEN || align=right | 3.2 km || 
|-id=298 bgcolor=#E9E9E9
| 39298 ||  || — || March 20, 2001 || Haleakala || NEAT || — || align=right | 3.6 km || 
|-id=299 bgcolor=#E9E9E9
| 39299 ||  || — || April 17, 2001 || Socorro || LINEAR || — || align=right | 4.9 km || 
|-id=300 bgcolor=#fefefe
| 39300 Auyeungsungfan ||  ||  || April 30, 2001 || Desert Beaver || W. K. Y. Yeung || — || align=right | 2.4 km || 
|}

39301–39400 

|-bgcolor=#d6d6d6
| 39301 ||  || — || July 27, 2001 || Anderson Mesa || LONEOS || 3:2 || align=right | 14 km || 
|-id=302 bgcolor=#d6d6d6
| 39302 ||  || — || August 16, 2001 || Socorro || LINEAR || TIR || align=right | 8.8 km || 
|-id=303 bgcolor=#E9E9E9
| 39303 ||  || — || August 16, 2001 || Socorro || LINEAR || WIT || align=right | 2.7 km || 
|-id=304 bgcolor=#fefefe
| 39304 ||  || — || August 16, 2001 || Socorro || LINEAR || — || align=right | 3.5 km || 
|-id=305 bgcolor=#d6d6d6
| 39305 ||  || — || August 29, 2001 || Palomar || NEAT || — || align=right | 15 km || 
|-id=306 bgcolor=#d6d6d6
| 39306 ||  || — || September 19, 2001 || Socorro || LINEAR || THM || align=right | 7.9 km || 
|-id=307 bgcolor=#E9E9E9
| 39307 ||  || — || October 14, 2001 || Socorro || LINEAR || — || align=right | 3.5 km || 
|-id=308 bgcolor=#d6d6d6
| 39308 ||  || — || October 13, 2001 || Socorro || LINEAR || — || align=right | 5.7 km || 
|-id=309 bgcolor=#d6d6d6
| 39309 ||  || — || October 13, 2001 || Socorro || LINEAR || — || align=right | 7.1 km || 
|-id=310 bgcolor=#d6d6d6
| 39310 ||  || — || October 13, 2001 || Socorro || LINEAR || — || align=right | 6.3 km || 
|-id=311 bgcolor=#d6d6d6
| 39311 ||  || — || October 13, 2001 || Socorro || LINEAR || — || align=right | 4.8 km || 
|-id=312 bgcolor=#d6d6d6
| 39312 ||  || — || October 14, 2001 || Socorro || LINEAR || — || align=right | 9.4 km || 
|-id=313 bgcolor=#E9E9E9
| 39313 ||  || — || October 13, 2001 || Socorro || LINEAR || — || align=right | 3.1 km || 
|-id=314 bgcolor=#E9E9E9
| 39314 Moritakumi ||  ||  || October 19, 2001 || Bisei SG Center || BATTeRS || — || align=right | 3.4 km || 
|-id=315 bgcolor=#d6d6d6
| 39315 ||  || — || October 17, 2001 || Socorro || LINEAR || — || align=right | 11 km || 
|-id=316 bgcolor=#fefefe
| 39316 ||  || — || October 20, 2001 || Socorro || LINEAR || MAS || align=right | 1.3 km || 
|-id=317 bgcolor=#E9E9E9
| 39317 ||  || — || October 19, 2001 || Socorro || LINEAR || MIT || align=right | 11 km || 
|-id=318 bgcolor=#fefefe
| 39318 ||  || — || November 9, 2001 || Socorro || LINEAR || — || align=right | 2.2 km || 
|-id=319 bgcolor=#d6d6d6
| 39319 ||  || — || November 9, 2001 || Socorro || LINEAR || — || align=right | 5.4 km || 
|-id=320 bgcolor=#d6d6d6
| 39320 ||  || — || November 9, 2001 || Socorro || LINEAR || — || align=right | 10 km || 
|-id=321 bgcolor=#fefefe
| 39321 ||  || — || November 12, 2001 || Socorro || LINEAR || NYS || align=right | 1.5 km || 
|-id=322 bgcolor=#E9E9E9
| 39322 ||  || — || November 15, 2001 || Socorro || LINEAR || — || align=right | 7.2 km || 
|-id=323 bgcolor=#E9E9E9
| 39323 ||  || — || November 17, 2001 || Socorro || LINEAR || — || align=right | 5.0 km || 
|-id=324 bgcolor=#fefefe
| 39324 ||  || — || November 17, 2001 || Socorro || LINEAR || V || align=right | 2.0 km || 
|-id=325 bgcolor=#E9E9E9
| 39325 ||  || — || November 17, 2001 || Socorro || LINEAR || — || align=right | 2.6 km || 
|-id=326 bgcolor=#d6d6d6
| 39326 ||  || — || December 14, 2001 || Socorro || LINEAR || — || align=right | 11 km || 
|-id=327 bgcolor=#d6d6d6
| 39327 ||  || — || December 10, 2001 || Socorro || LINEAR || — || align=right | 6.8 km || 
|-id=328 bgcolor=#fefefe
| 39328 ||  || — || December 13, 2001 || Socorro || LINEAR || FLO || align=right | 1.5 km || 
|-id=329 bgcolor=#d6d6d6
| 39329 ||  || — || December 14, 2001 || Socorro || LINEAR || — || align=right | 5.1 km || 
|-id=330 bgcolor=#fefefe
| 39330 ||  || — || December 14, 2001 || Socorro || LINEAR || NYS || align=right | 1.5 km || 
|-id=331 bgcolor=#E9E9E9
| 39331 ||  || — || December 18, 2001 || Socorro || LINEAR || — || align=right | 5.2 km || 
|-id=332 bgcolor=#d6d6d6
| 39332 Lauwaiming ||  ||  || January 11, 2002 || Desert Eagle || W. K. Y. Yeung || — || align=right | 6.7 km || 
|-id=333 bgcolor=#fefefe
| 39333 ||  || — || January 4, 2002 || Haleakala || NEAT || — || align=right | 1.8 km || 
|-id=334 bgcolor=#E9E9E9
| 39334 ||  || — || January 6, 2002 || Haleakala || NEAT || — || align=right | 2.6 km || 
|-id=335 bgcolor=#E9E9E9
| 39335 Caccin ||  ||  || January 10, 2002 || Campo Imperatore || CINEOS || — || align=right | 4.7 km || 
|-id=336 bgcolor=#d6d6d6
| 39336 Mariacapria ||  ||  || January 11, 2002 || Campo Imperatore || CINEOS || THM || align=right | 4.9 km || 
|-id=337 bgcolor=#fefefe
| 39337 ||  || — || January 12, 2002 || Desert Eagle || W. K. Y. Yeung || NYS || align=right | 2.0 km || 
|-id=338 bgcolor=#fefefe
| 39338 ||  || — || January 7, 2002 || Anderson Mesa || LONEOS || NYS || align=right | 2.3 km || 
|-id=339 bgcolor=#d6d6d6
| 39339 ||  || — || January 8, 2002 || Haleakala || NEAT || THM || align=right | 5.5 km || 
|-id=340 bgcolor=#d6d6d6
| 39340 ||  || — || January 9, 2002 || Socorro || LINEAR || — || align=right | 5.9 km || 
|-id=341 bgcolor=#E9E9E9
| 39341 ||  || — || January 9, 2002 || Socorro || LINEAR || — || align=right | 3.7 km || 
|-id=342 bgcolor=#d6d6d6
| 39342 ||  || — || January 9, 2002 || Socorro || LINEAR || EOS || align=right | 5.2 km || 
|-id=343 bgcolor=#E9E9E9
| 39343 ||  || — || January 9, 2002 || Socorro || LINEAR || — || align=right | 5.7 km || 
|-id=344 bgcolor=#d6d6d6
| 39344 ||  || — || January 9, 2002 || Socorro || LINEAR || — || align=right | 7.9 km || 
|-id=345 bgcolor=#E9E9E9
| 39345 ||  || — || January 11, 2002 || Socorro || LINEAR || EUN || align=right | 3.4 km || 
|-id=346 bgcolor=#E9E9E9
| 39346 ||  || — || January 9, 2002 || Socorro || LINEAR || — || align=right | 4.2 km || 
|-id=347 bgcolor=#E9E9E9
| 39347 ||  || — || January 9, 2002 || Socorro || LINEAR || — || align=right | 2.1 km || 
|-id=348 bgcolor=#d6d6d6
| 39348 ||  || — || January 9, 2002 || Socorro || LINEAR || THM || align=right | 7.0 km || 
|-id=349 bgcolor=#E9E9E9
| 39349 ||  || — || January 9, 2002 || Socorro || LINEAR || — || align=right | 3.1 km || 
|-id=350 bgcolor=#E9E9E9
| 39350 ||  || — || January 9, 2002 || Socorro || LINEAR || — || align=right | 5.3 km || 
|-id=351 bgcolor=#fefefe
| 39351 ||  || — || January 9, 2002 || Socorro || LINEAR || — || align=right | 2.1 km || 
|-id=352 bgcolor=#d6d6d6
| 39352 ||  || — || January 9, 2002 || Socorro || LINEAR || — || align=right | 6.6 km || 
|-id=353 bgcolor=#E9E9E9
| 39353 ||  || — || January 13, 2002 || Socorro || LINEAR || — || align=right | 5.9 km || 
|-id=354 bgcolor=#fefefe
| 39354 ||  || — || January 11, 2002 || Socorro || LINEAR || ERI || align=right | 6.3 km || 
|-id=355 bgcolor=#fefefe
| 39355 ||  || — || January 13, 2002 || Socorro || LINEAR || — || align=right | 2.0 km || 
|-id=356 bgcolor=#d6d6d6
| 39356 ||  || — || January 13, 2002 || Socorro || LINEAR || 7:4 || align=right | 9.7 km || 
|-id=357 bgcolor=#E9E9E9
| 39357 ||  || — || January 13, 2002 || Socorro || LINEAR || — || align=right | 4.5 km || 
|-id=358 bgcolor=#d6d6d6
| 39358 ||  || — || January 13, 2002 || Socorro || LINEAR || EOS || align=right | 4.4 km || 
|-id=359 bgcolor=#E9E9E9
| 39359 ||  || — || January 14, 2002 || Socorro || LINEAR || GEF || align=right | 3.1 km || 
|-id=360 bgcolor=#fefefe
| 39360 ||  || — || January 14, 2002 || Socorro || LINEAR || MAS || align=right | 2.3 km || 
|-id=361 bgcolor=#fefefe
| 39361 ||  || — || January 14, 2002 || Socorro || LINEAR || — || align=right | 1.7 km || 
|-id=362 bgcolor=#C2FFFF
| 39362 ||  || — || January 21, 2002 || Desert Eagle || W. K. Y. Yeung || L4 || align=right | 15 km || 
|-id=363 bgcolor=#fefefe
| 39363 ||  || — || January 18, 2002 || Socorro || LINEAR || FLO || align=right | 1.4 km || 
|-id=364 bgcolor=#E9E9E9
| 39364 ||  || — || January 18, 2002 || Socorro || LINEAR || — || align=right | 5.2 km || 
|-id=365 bgcolor=#fefefe
| 39365 ||  || — || January 18, 2002 || Socorro || LINEAR || — || align=right | 2.1 km || 
|-id=366 bgcolor=#fefefe
| 39366 ||  || — || January 18, 2002 || Socorro || LINEAR || NYS || align=right | 2.4 km || 
|-id=367 bgcolor=#E9E9E9
| 39367 ||  || — || January 19, 2002 || Socorro || LINEAR || — || align=right | 5.4 km || 
|-id=368 bgcolor=#fefefe
| 39368 ||  || — || January 21, 2002 || Socorro || LINEAR || NYS || align=right | 2.2 km || 
|-id=369 bgcolor=#C2FFFF
| 39369 ||  || — || February 8, 2002 || Fountain Hills || C. W. Juels || L4 || align=right | 33 km || 
|-id=370 bgcolor=#E9E9E9
| 39370 ||  || — || February 5, 2002 || Palomar || NEAT || HEN || align=right | 2.2 km || 
|-id=371 bgcolor=#d6d6d6
| 39371 ||  || — || February 3, 2002 || Haleakala || NEAT || — || align=right | 4.4 km || 
|-id=372 bgcolor=#d6d6d6
| 39372 ||  || — || February 12, 2002 || Desert Eagle || W. K. Y. Yeung || HYG || align=right | 8.2 km || 
|-id=373 bgcolor=#fefefe
| 39373 ||  || — || February 7, 2002 || Socorro || LINEAR || NYS || align=right | 1.6 km || 
|-id=374 bgcolor=#E9E9E9
| 39374 ||  || — || February 7, 2002 || Socorro || LINEAR || HEN || align=right | 2.5 km || 
|-id=375 bgcolor=#fefefe
| 39375 ||  || — || February 7, 2002 || Socorro || LINEAR || — || align=right | 2.2 km || 
|-id=376 bgcolor=#fefefe
| 39376 ||  || — || February 7, 2002 || Socorro || LINEAR || EUT || align=right | 2.8 km || 
|-id=377 bgcolor=#E9E9E9
| 39377 ||  || — || February 7, 2002 || Socorro || LINEAR || — || align=right | 1.5 km || 
|-id=378 bgcolor=#E9E9E9
| 39378 || 2101 P-L || — || September 24, 1960 || Palomar || PLS || — || align=right | 5.8 km || 
|-id=379 bgcolor=#fefefe
| 39379 || 2120 P-L || — || September 24, 1960 || Palomar || PLS || V || align=right | 1.3 km || 
|-id=380 bgcolor=#fefefe
| 39380 || 2169 P-L || — || September 24, 1960 || Palomar || PLS || V || align=right | 1.5 km || 
|-id=381 bgcolor=#fefefe
| 39381 || 2603 P-L || — || September 24, 1960 || Palomar || PLS || — || align=right | 1.5 km || 
|-id=382 bgcolor=#d6d6d6
| 39382 Opportunity || 2696 P-L ||  || September 24, 1960 || Palomar || PLS || 3:2 || align=right | 7.5 km || 
|-id=383 bgcolor=#E9E9E9
| 39383 || 2765 P-L || — || September 24, 1960 || Palomar || PLS || — || align=right | 3.0 km || 
|-id=384 bgcolor=#d6d6d6
| 39384 || 2814 P-L || — || September 24, 1960 || Palomar || PLS || — || align=right | 6.2 km || 
|-id=385 bgcolor=#E9E9E9
| 39385 || 4017 P-L || — || September 24, 1960 || Palomar || PLS || — || align=right | 7.0 km || 
|-id=386 bgcolor=#fefefe
| 39386 || 4039 P-L || — || September 24, 1960 || Palomar || PLS || NYS || align=right | 1.5 km || 
|-id=387 bgcolor=#E9E9E9
| 39387 || 4150 P-L || — || September 24, 1960 || Palomar || PLS || ADE || align=right | 6.0 km || 
|-id=388 bgcolor=#fefefe
| 39388 || 4190 P-L || — || September 24, 1960 || Palomar || PLS || V || align=right | 1.6 km || 
|-id=389 bgcolor=#d6d6d6
| 39389 || 4191 P-L || — || September 24, 1960 || Palomar || PLS || — || align=right | 4.6 km || 
|-id=390 bgcolor=#fefefe
| 39390 || 4839 P-L || — || September 24, 1960 || Palomar || PLS || NYS || align=right | 3.3 km || 
|-id=391 bgcolor=#fefefe
| 39391 || 4885 P-L || — || September 24, 1960 || Palomar || PLS || — || align=right | 1.3 km || 
|-id=392 bgcolor=#d6d6d6
| 39392 || 4893 P-L || — || September 24, 1960 || Palomar || PLS || KOR || align=right | 4.6 km || 
|-id=393 bgcolor=#fefefe
| 39393 || 5564 P-L || — || October 17, 1960 || Palomar || PLS || NYS || align=right | 1.7 km || 
|-id=394 bgcolor=#fefefe
| 39394 || 6027 P-L || — || September 24, 1960 || Palomar || PLS || NYS || align=right | 1.5 km || 
|-id=395 bgcolor=#fefefe
| 39395 || 6199 P-L || — || September 24, 1960 || Palomar || PLS || — || align=right | 1.6 km || 
|-id=396 bgcolor=#fefefe
| 39396 || 6243 P-L || — || September 24, 1960 || Palomar || PLS || — || align=right | 4.7 km || 
|-id=397 bgcolor=#E9E9E9
| 39397 || 6514 P-L || — || September 24, 1960 || Palomar || PLS || — || align=right | 3.1 km || 
|-id=398 bgcolor=#E9E9E9
| 39398 || 6609 P-L || — || September 24, 1960 || Palomar || PLS || EUN || align=right | 2.2 km || 
|-id=399 bgcolor=#d6d6d6
| 39399 || 6688 P-L || — || September 24, 1960 || Palomar || PLS || HYG || align=right | 6.8 km || 
|-id=400 bgcolor=#d6d6d6
| 39400 || 6808 P-L || — || September 24, 1960 || Palomar || PLS || HYG || align=right | 5.7 km || 
|}

39401–39500 

|-bgcolor=#fefefe
| 39401 || 7572 P-L || — || September 27, 1960 || Palomar || PLS || — || align=right | 2.2 km || 
|-id=402 bgcolor=#E9E9E9
| 39402 || 9074 P-L || — || October 17, 1960 || Palomar || PLS || — || align=right | 5.9 km || 
|-id=403 bgcolor=#d6d6d6
| 39403 || 9514 P-L || — || October 22, 1960 || Palomar || PLS || KOR || align=right | 3.5 km || 
|-id=404 bgcolor=#d6d6d6
| 39404 || 9582 P-L || — || October 17, 1960 || Palomar || PLS || TIR || align=right | 4.3 km || 
|-id=405 bgcolor=#d6d6d6
| 39405 Mosigkau || 1063 T-1 ||  || March 25, 1971 || Palomar || PLS || SHU3:2 || align=right | 15 km || 
|-id=406 bgcolor=#fefefe
| 39406 || 1145 T-1 || — || March 25, 1971 || Palomar || PLS || — || align=right | 2.6 km || 
|-id=407 bgcolor=#fefefe
| 39407 || 1187 T-1 || — || March 25, 1971 || Palomar || PLS || — || align=right | 1.0 km || 
|-id=408 bgcolor=#d6d6d6
| 39408 || 1273 T-1 || — || March 26, 1971 || Palomar || PLS || — || align=right | 6.4 km || 
|-id=409 bgcolor=#fefefe
| 39409 || 2100 T-1 || — || March 25, 1971 || Palomar || PLS || FLO || align=right | 1.7 km || 
|-id=410 bgcolor=#fefefe
| 39410 || 2191 T-1 || — || March 25, 1971 || Palomar || PLS || FLO || align=right | 1.4 km || 
|-id=411 bgcolor=#d6d6d6
| 39411 || 2266 T-1 || — || March 25, 1971 || Palomar || PLS || — || align=right | 6.4 km || 
|-id=412 bgcolor=#fefefe
| 39412 || 3097 T-1 || — || March 26, 1971 || Palomar || PLS || — || align=right | 1.9 km || 
|-id=413 bgcolor=#fefefe
| 39413 || 3113 T-1 || — || March 26, 1971 || Palomar || PLS || — || align=right | 2.6 km || 
|-id=414 bgcolor=#fefefe
| 39414 || 3283 T-1 || — || March 26, 1971 || Palomar || PLS || — || align=right | 2.7 km || 
|-id=415 bgcolor=#d6d6d6
| 39415 Janeausten || 4231 T-1 ||  || March 26, 1971 || Palomar || PLS || 3:2 || align=right | 9.0 km || 
|-id=416 bgcolor=#fefefe
| 39416 || 1024 T-2 || — || September 29, 1973 || Palomar || PLS || — || align=right | 2.1 km || 
|-id=417 bgcolor=#E9E9E9
| 39417 || 1100 T-2 || — || September 29, 1973 || Palomar || PLS || — || align=right | 2.8 km || 
|-id=418 bgcolor=#fefefe
| 39418 || 1204 T-2 || — || September 29, 1973 || Palomar || PLS || — || align=right | 2.4 km || 
|-id=419 bgcolor=#E9E9E9
| 39419 || 1244 T-2 || — || September 29, 1973 || Palomar || PLS || — || align=right | 2.7 km || 
|-id=420 bgcolor=#fefefe
| 39420 Elizabethgaskell || 2084 T-2 ||  || September 29, 1973 || Palomar || PLS || Hslow? || align=right | 1.8 km || 
|-id=421 bgcolor=#fefefe
| 39421 || 2128 T-2 || — || September 29, 1973 || Palomar || PLS || — || align=right | 2.9 km || 
|-id=422 bgcolor=#d6d6d6
| 39422 || 3109 T-2 || — || September 30, 1973 || Palomar || PLS || — || align=right | 5.1 km || 
|-id=423 bgcolor=#d6d6d6
| 39423 || 3136 T-2 || — || September 30, 1973 || Palomar || PLS || — || align=right | 3.9 km || 
|-id=424 bgcolor=#fefefe
| 39424 || 3143 T-2 || — || September 30, 1973 || Palomar || PLS || — || align=right | 2.9 km || 
|-id=425 bgcolor=#d6d6d6
| 39425 || 3240 T-2 || — || September 30, 1973 || Palomar || PLS || — || align=right | 6.5 km || 
|-id=426 bgcolor=#fefefe
| 39426 || 3278 T-2 || — || September 30, 1973 || Palomar || PLS || NYS || align=right | 1.7 km || 
|-id=427 bgcolor=#d6d6d6
| 39427 Charlottebrontë || 3360 T-2 ||  || September 25, 1973 || Palomar || PLS || SHU3:2 || align=right | 15 km || 
|-id=428 bgcolor=#fefefe
| 39428 Emilybrontë || 4169 T-2 ||  || September 29, 1973 || Palomar || PLS || NYS || align=right | 2.4 km || 
|-id=429 bgcolor=#fefefe
| 39429 Annebrontë || 4223 T-2 ||  || September 29, 1973 || Palomar || PLS || — || align=right | 2.6 km || 
|-id=430 bgcolor=#E9E9E9
| 39430 || 4264 T-2 || — || September 29, 1973 || Palomar || PLS || — || align=right | 4.3 km || 
|-id=431 bgcolor=#d6d6d6
| 39431 || 5178 T-2 || — || September 25, 1973 || Palomar || PLS || EOS || align=right | 5.8 km || 
|-id=432 bgcolor=#E9E9E9
| 39432 || 1079 T-3 || — || October 17, 1977 || Palomar || PLS || EUN || align=right | 3.8 km || 
|-id=433 bgcolor=#d6d6d6
| 39433 || 1113 T-3 || — || October 17, 1977 || Palomar || PLS || — || align=right | 7.9 km || 
|-id=434 bgcolor=#fefefe
| 39434 || 1202 T-3 || — || October 17, 1977 || Palomar || PLS || — || align=right | 1.9 km || 
|-id=435 bgcolor=#E9E9E9
| 39435 || 2029 T-3 || — || October 16, 1977 || Palomar || PLS || PAE || align=right | 9.0 km || 
|-id=436 bgcolor=#fefefe
| 39436 || 2162 T-3 || — || October 16, 1977 || Palomar || PLS || V || align=right | 1.7 km || 
|-id=437 bgcolor=#d6d6d6
| 39437 || 2203 T-3 || — || October 16, 1977 || Palomar || PLS || — || align=right | 6.9 km || 
|-id=438 bgcolor=#fefefe
| 39438 || 2218 T-3 || — || October 16, 1977 || Palomar || PLS || — || align=right | 2.5 km || 
|-id=439 bgcolor=#d6d6d6
| 39439 || 2242 T-3 || — || October 16, 1977 || Palomar || PLS || — || align=right | 7.9 km || 
|-id=440 bgcolor=#fefefe
| 39440 || 2282 T-3 || — || October 16, 1977 || Palomar || PLS || — || align=right | 2.3 km || 
|-id=441 bgcolor=#d6d6d6
| 39441 || 2293 T-3 || — || October 16, 1977 || Palomar || PLS || — || align=right | 6.2 km || 
|-id=442 bgcolor=#fefefe
| 39442 || 2384 T-3 || — || October 16, 1977 || Palomar || PLS || FLO || align=right | 1.7 km || 
|-id=443 bgcolor=#d6d6d6
| 39443 || 2394 T-3 || — || October 16, 1977 || Palomar || PLS || — || align=right | 10 km || 
|-id=444 bgcolor=#d6d6d6
| 39444 || 3264 T-3 || — || October 16, 1977 || Palomar || PLS || THM || align=right | 4.8 km || 
|-id=445 bgcolor=#fefefe
| 39445 || 3336 T-3 || — || October 16, 1977 || Palomar || PLS || — || align=right | 1.6 km || 
|-id=446 bgcolor=#d6d6d6
| 39446 || 3348 T-3 || — || October 16, 1977 || Palomar || PLS || — || align=right | 8.3 km || 
|-id=447 bgcolor=#E9E9E9
| 39447 || 3412 T-3 || — || October 16, 1977 || Palomar || PLS || GEF || align=right | 3.2 km || 
|-id=448 bgcolor=#E9E9E9
| 39448 || 3455 T-3 || — || October 16, 1977 || Palomar || PLS || HEN || align=right | 2.5 km || 
|-id=449 bgcolor=#d6d6d6
| 39449 || 3486 T-3 || — || October 16, 1977 || Palomar || PLS || THM || align=right | 4.4 km || 
|-id=450 bgcolor=#d6d6d6
| 39450 || 3552 T-3 || — || October 16, 1977 || Palomar || PLS || THM || align=right | 5.4 km || 
|-id=451 bgcolor=#fefefe
| 39451 || 3992 T-3 || — || October 16, 1977 || Palomar || PLS || NYS || align=right | 4.5 km || 
|-id=452 bgcolor=#fefefe
| 39452 || 4027 T-3 || — || October 16, 1977 || Palomar || PLS || FLO || align=right | 1.5 km || 
|-id=453 bgcolor=#d6d6d6
| 39453 || 4070 T-3 || — || October 16, 1977 || Palomar || PLS || ALA || align=right | 10 km || 
|-id=454 bgcolor=#E9E9E9
| 39454 || 4082 T-3 || — || October 16, 1977 || Palomar || PLS || EUN || align=right | 3.5 km || 
|-id=455 bgcolor=#d6d6d6
| 39455 || 4091 T-3 || — || October 16, 1977 || Palomar || PLS || — || align=right | 7.9 km || 
|-id=456 bgcolor=#E9E9E9
| 39456 || 4120 T-3 || — || October 16, 1977 || Palomar || PLS || — || align=right | 5.3 km || 
|-id=457 bgcolor=#E9E9E9
| 39457 || 4167 T-3 || — || October 16, 1977 || Palomar || PLS || — || align=right | 2.4 km || 
|-id=458 bgcolor=#d6d6d6
| 39458 || 4198 T-3 || — || October 16, 1977 || Palomar || PLS || — || align=right | 11 km || 
|-id=459 bgcolor=#d6d6d6
| 39459 || 4266 T-3 || — || October 16, 1977 || Palomar || PLS || — || align=right | 15 km || 
|-id=460 bgcolor=#d6d6d6
| 39460 || 4332 T-3 || — || October 16, 1977 || Palomar || PLS || TIR || align=right | 6.2 km || 
|-id=461 bgcolor=#d6d6d6
| 39461 || 5019 T-3 || — || October 16, 1977 || Palomar || PLS || — || align=right | 8.9 km || 
|-id=462 bgcolor=#fefefe
| 39462 || 5175 T-3 || — || October 16, 1977 || Palomar || PLS || — || align=right | 5.3 km || 
|-id=463 bgcolor=#C2FFFF
| 39463 Phyleus || 1973 SZ ||  || September 19, 1973 || Palomar || PLS || L4 || align=right | 13 km || 
|-id=464 bgcolor=#fefefe
| 39464 Pöppelmann ||  ||  || October 27, 1973 || Tautenburg Observatory || F. Börngen || MAS || align=right | 2.2 km || 
|-id=465 bgcolor=#fefefe
| 39465 ||  || — || September 2, 1978 || La Silla || C.-I. Lagerkvist || — || align=right | 2.4 km || 
|-id=466 bgcolor=#fefefe
| 39466 ||  || — || September 2, 1978 || La Silla || C.-I. Lagerkvist || V || align=right | 1.6 km || 
|-id=467 bgcolor=#fefefe
| 39467 ||  || — || September 2, 1978 || La Silla || C.-I. Lagerkvist || — || align=right | 2.1 km || 
|-id=468 bgcolor=#fefefe
| 39468 ||  || — || September 2, 1978 || La Silla || C.-I. Lagerkvist || V || align=right | 1.7 km || 
|-id=469 bgcolor=#E9E9E9
| 39469 ||  || — || September 2, 1978 || La Silla || C.-I. Lagerkvist || — || align=right | 3.5 km || 
|-id=470 bgcolor=#E9E9E9
| 39470 ||  || — || October 27, 1978 || Palomar || C. M. Olmstead || — || align=right | 3.3 km || 
|-id=471 bgcolor=#fefefe
| 39471 ||  || — || October 27, 1978 || Palomar || C. M. Olmstead || — || align=right | 2.2 km || 
|-id=472 bgcolor=#d6d6d6
| 39472 ||  || — || November 7, 1978 || Palomar || E. F. Helin, S. J. Bus || EOS || align=right | 5.2 km || 
|-id=473 bgcolor=#fefefe
| 39473 ||  || — || November 6, 1978 || Palomar || E. F. Helin, S. J. Bus || — || align=right | 2.5 km || 
|-id=474 bgcolor=#C2FFFF
| 39474 ||  || — || November 7, 1978 || Palomar || E. F. Helin, S. J. Bus || L5 || align=right | 26 km || 
|-id=475 bgcolor=#d6d6d6
| 39475 ||  || — || November 7, 1978 || Palomar || E. F. Helin, S. J. Bus || — || align=right | 3.7 km || 
|-id=476 bgcolor=#fefefe
| 39476 ||  || — || June 25, 1979 || Siding Spring || E. F. Helin, S. J. Bus || — || align=right | 1.9 km || 
|-id=477 bgcolor=#d6d6d6
| 39477 ||  || — || June 25, 1979 || Siding Spring || E. F. Helin, S. J. Bus || — || align=right | 5.2 km || 
|-id=478 bgcolor=#fefefe
| 39478 ||  || — || March 16, 1980 || La Silla || C.-I. Lagerkvist || V || align=right | 1.6 km || 
|-id=479 bgcolor=#fefefe
| 39479 ||  || — || October 31, 1980 || Palomar || S. J. Bus || FLO || align=right | 2.0 km || 
|-id=480 bgcolor=#fefefe
| 39480 || 1981 DU || — || February 28, 1981 || Siding Spring || S. J. Bus || — || align=right | 3.2 km || 
|-id=481 bgcolor=#fefefe
| 39481 ||  || — || February 28, 1981 || Siding Spring || S. J. Bus || V || align=right | 1.9 km || 
|-id=482 bgcolor=#d6d6d6
| 39482 ||  || — || February 28, 1981 || Siding Spring || S. J. Bus || EMA || align=right | 7.6 km || 
|-id=483 bgcolor=#fefefe
| 39483 ||  || — || February 28, 1981 || Siding Spring || S. J. Bus || — || align=right | 1.6 km || 
|-id=484 bgcolor=#d6d6d6
| 39484 ||  || — || February 28, 1981 || Siding Spring || S. J. Bus || EOS || align=right | 4.5 km || 
|-id=485 bgcolor=#E9E9E9
| 39485 ||  || — || March 2, 1981 || Siding Spring || S. J. Bus || — || align=right | 6.5 km || 
|-id=486 bgcolor=#E9E9E9
| 39486 ||  || — || March 7, 1981 || Siding Spring || S. J. Bus || — || align=right | 7.0 km || 
|-id=487 bgcolor=#fefefe
| 39487 ||  || — || March 7, 1981 || Siding Spring || S. J. Bus || KLI || align=right | 4.7 km || 
|-id=488 bgcolor=#E9E9E9
| 39488 ||  || — || March 6, 1981 || Siding Spring || S. J. Bus || MAR || align=right | 2.9 km || 
|-id=489 bgcolor=#FA8072
| 39489 ||  || — || March 6, 1981 || Siding Spring || S. J. Bus || — || align=right | 2.7 km || 
|-id=490 bgcolor=#d6d6d6
| 39490 ||  || — || March 1, 1981 || Siding Spring || S. J. Bus || — || align=right | 6.3 km || 
|-id=491 bgcolor=#E9E9E9
| 39491 ||  || — || March 1, 1981 || Siding Spring || S. J. Bus || — || align=right | 2.6 km || 
|-id=492 bgcolor=#E9E9E9
| 39492 ||  || — || March 1, 1981 || Siding Spring || S. J. Bus || — || align=right | 3.4 km || 
|-id=493 bgcolor=#fefefe
| 39493 ||  || — || March 1, 1981 || Siding Spring || S. J. Bus || — || align=right | 1.6 km || 
|-id=494 bgcolor=#fefefe
| 39494 ||  || — || March 7, 1981 || Siding Spring || S. J. Bus || V || align=right | 1.8 km || 
|-id=495 bgcolor=#fefefe
| 39495 ||  || — || March 7, 1981 || Siding Spring || S. J. Bus || — || align=right | 2.5 km || 
|-id=496 bgcolor=#E9E9E9
| 39496 ||  || — || March 1, 1981 || Siding Spring || S. J. Bus || — || align=right | 5.0 km || 
|-id=497 bgcolor=#E9E9E9
| 39497 ||  || — || March 2, 1981 || Siding Spring || S. J. Bus || — || align=right | 2.0 km || 
|-id=498 bgcolor=#E9E9E9
| 39498 ||  || — || March 2, 1981 || Siding Spring || S. J. Bus || — || align=right | 2.0 km || 
|-id=499 bgcolor=#d6d6d6
| 39499 ||  || — || March 1, 1981 || Siding Spring || S. J. Bus || EOS || align=right | 5.6 km || 
|-id=500 bgcolor=#fefefe
| 39500 ||  || — || March 2, 1981 || Siding Spring || S. J. Bus || V || align=right | 1.4 km || 
|}

39501–39600 

|-bgcolor=#fefefe
| 39501 ||  || — || March 2, 1981 || Siding Spring || F. Dossin || FLO || align=right | 2.2 km || 
|-id=502 bgcolor=#d6d6d6
| 39502 ||  || — || March 6, 1981 || Siding Spring || S. J. Bus || — || align=right | 7.1 km || 
|-id=503 bgcolor=#fefefe
| 39503 ||  || — || March 1, 1981 || Siding Spring || S. J. Bus || — || align=right | 2.0 km || 
|-id=504 bgcolor=#fefefe
| 39504 ||  || — || March 2, 1981 || Siding Spring || S. J. Bus || FLO || align=right | 1.8 km || 
|-id=505 bgcolor=#d6d6d6
| 39505 ||  || — || March 2, 1981 || Siding Spring || S. J. Bus || — || align=right | 6.6 km || 
|-id=506 bgcolor=#fefefe
| 39506 ||  || — || March 7, 1981 || Siding Spring || S. J. Bus || — || align=right | 1.7 km || 
|-id=507 bgcolor=#d6d6d6
| 39507 ||  || — || March 7, 1981 || Siding Spring || S. J. Bus || — || align=right | 6.1 km || 
|-id=508 bgcolor=#d6d6d6
| 39508 ||  || — || March 2, 1981 || Siding Spring || S. J. Bus || — || align=right | 5.5 km || 
|-id=509 bgcolor=#E9E9E9
| 39509 Kardashev ||  ||  || October 22, 1981 || Nauchnij || N. S. Chernykh || DOR || align=right | 7.7 km || 
|-id=510 bgcolor=#d6d6d6
| 39510 || 1982 DU || — || February 21, 1982 || Anderson Mesa || E. Bowell || — || align=right | 17 km || 
|-id=511 bgcolor=#fefefe
| 39511 ||  || — || September 18, 1985 || La Silla || H. Debehogne || NYS || align=right | 5.1 km || 
|-id=512 bgcolor=#fefefe
| 39512 ||  || — || October 15, 1985 || Anderson Mesa || E. Bowell || NYS || align=right | 2.3 km || 
|-id=513 bgcolor=#fefefe
| 39513 ||  || — || August 26, 1986 || La Silla || H. Debehogne || — || align=right | 3.1 km || 
|-id=514 bgcolor=#fefefe
| 39514 ||  || — || October 4, 1986 || Kleť || A. Mrkos || — || align=right | 3.0 km || 
|-id=515 bgcolor=#fefefe
| 39515 ||  || — || December 4, 1986 || Kleť || A. Mrkos || — || align=right | 4.9 km || 
|-id=516 bgcolor=#E9E9E9
| 39516 Lusigny || 1987 OO ||  || July 27, 1987 || Haute Provence || E. W. Elst || — || align=right | 3.7 km || 
|-id=517 bgcolor=#fefefe
| 39517 ||  || — || February 11, 1988 || La Silla || E. W. Elst || — || align=right | 2.6 km || 
|-id=518 bgcolor=#E9E9E9
| 39518 ||  || — || February 13, 1988 || La Silla || E. W. Elst || — || align=right | 9.8 km || 
|-id=519 bgcolor=#fefefe
| 39519 ||  || — || February 13, 1988 || La Silla || E. W. Elst || V || align=right | 1.7 km || 
|-id=520 bgcolor=#fefefe
| 39520 || 1988 NY || — || July 12, 1988 || Palomar || E. F. Helin || PHO || align=right | 3.7 km || 
|-id=521 bgcolor=#fefefe
| 39521 || 1988 PQ || — || August 11, 1988 || Siding Spring || A. J. Noymer || FLO || align=right | 1.8 km || 
|-id=522 bgcolor=#fefefe
| 39522 ||  || — || September 14, 1988 || Cerro Tololo || S. J. Bus || — || align=right | 3.1 km || 
|-id=523 bgcolor=#fefefe
| 39523 ||  || — || September 26, 1989 || La Silla || E. W. Elst || — || align=right | 4.7 km || 
|-id=524 bgcolor=#E9E9E9
| 39524 ||  || — || September 26, 1989 || La Silla || E. W. Elst || DOR || align=right | 6.3 km || 
|-id=525 bgcolor=#d6d6d6
| 39525 ||  || — || October 3, 1989 || Cerro Tololo || S. J. Bus || — || align=right | 9.3 km || 
|-id=526 bgcolor=#fefefe
| 39526 ||  || — || October 7, 1989 || La Silla || E. W. Elst || FLO || align=right | 2.3 km || 
|-id=527 bgcolor=#fefefe
| 39527 ||  || — || October 7, 1989 || La Silla || E. W. Elst || NYS || align=right | 2.3 km || 
|-id=528 bgcolor=#fefefe
| 39528 ||  || — || October 4, 1989 || La Silla || H. Debehogne || FLO || align=right | 1.9 km || 
|-id=529 bgcolor=#fefefe
| 39529 Vatnajökull ||  ||  || November 3, 1989 || La Silla || E. W. Elst || — || align=right | 1.8 km || 
|-id=530 bgcolor=#d6d6d6
| 39530 ||  || — || March 2, 1990 || La Silla || E. W. Elst || — || align=right | 9.4 km || 
|-id=531 bgcolor=#fefefe
| 39531 ||  || — || March 2, 1990 || La Silla || E. W. Elst || — || align=right | 3.0 km || 
|-id=532 bgcolor=#d6d6d6
| 39532 ||  || — || April 27, 1990 || Siding Spring || R. H. McNaught || — || align=right | 11 km || 
|-id=533 bgcolor=#fefefe
| 39533 ||  || — || August 28, 1990 || Palomar || H. E. Holt || — || align=right | 2.0 km || 
|-id=534 bgcolor=#E9E9E9
| 39534 ||  || — || September 14, 1990 || Palomar || H. E. Holt || EUN || align=right | 8.3 km || 
|-id=535 bgcolor=#E9E9E9
| 39535 ||  || — || September 14, 1990 || La Silla || H. Debehogne || — || align=right | 6.5 km || 
|-id=536 bgcolor=#fefefe
| 39536 Lenhof ||  ||  || October 10, 1990 || Tautenburg Observatory || L. D. Schmadel, F. Börngen || FLO || align=right | 1.7 km || 
|-id=537 bgcolor=#E9E9E9
| 39537 ||  || — || November 12, 1990 || Yorii || M. Arai, H. Mori || GEF || align=right | 5.9 km || 
|-id=538 bgcolor=#fefefe
| 39538 ||  || — || March 20, 1991 || La Silla || H. Debehogne || NYS || align=right | 2.6 km || 
|-id=539 bgcolor=#d6d6d6
| 39539 Emmadesmet ||  ||  || April 8, 1991 || La Silla || E. W. Elst || EMA || align=right | 13 km || 
|-id=540 bgcolor=#fefefe
| 39540 Borchert ||  ||  || April 11, 1991 || Tautenburg Observatory || F. Börngen || — || align=right | 1.9 km || 
|-id=541 bgcolor=#fefefe
| 39541 || 1991 LA || — || June 3, 1991 || Kitt Peak || Spacewatch || — || align=right | 1.1 km || 
|-id=542 bgcolor=#fefefe
| 39542 ||  || — || August 2, 1991 || La Silla || E. W. Elst || NYS || align=right | 1.7 km || 
|-id=543 bgcolor=#E9E9E9
| 39543 Aubriet ||  ||  || August 6, 1991 || La Silla || E. W. Elst || — || align=right | 7.8 km || 
|-id=544 bgcolor=#E9E9E9
| 39544 ||  || — || October 7, 1991 || Palomar || C. P. de Saint-Aignan || — || align=right | 4.0 km || 
|-id=545 bgcolor=#E9E9E9
| 39545 ||  || — || February 25, 1992 || Kitt Peak || Spacewatch || DOR || align=right | 6.2 km || 
|-id=546 bgcolor=#E9E9E9
| 39546 ||  || — || February 29, 1992 || La Silla || UESAC || HOFslow || align=right | 7.5 km || 
|-id=547 bgcolor=#E9E9E9
| 39547 ||  || — || February 29, 1992 || La Silla || UESAC || — || align=right | 4.1 km || 
|-id=548 bgcolor=#E9E9E9
| 39548 ||  || — || February 29, 1992 || La Silla || UESAC || AGN || align=right | 3.6 km || 
|-id=549 bgcolor=#E9E9E9
| 39549 Casals ||  ||  || February 27, 1992 || Tautenburg Observatory || F. Börngen || — || align=right | 6.7 km || 
|-id=550 bgcolor=#E9E9E9
| 39550 ||  || — || March 1, 1992 || La Silla || UESAC || — || align=right | 5.3 km || 
|-id=551 bgcolor=#fefefe
| 39551 ||  || — || March 2, 1992 || La Silla || UESAC || — || align=right | 2.8 km || 
|-id=552 bgcolor=#E9E9E9
| 39552 ||  || — || March 2, 1992 || La Silla || UESAC || — || align=right | 5.7 km || 
|-id=553 bgcolor=#E9E9E9
| 39553 ||  || — || March 6, 1992 || La Silla || UESAC || AGN || align=right | 3.8 km || 
|-id=554 bgcolor=#E9E9E9
| 39554 ||  || — || March 1, 1992 || La Silla || UESAC || HOF || align=right | 8.4 km || 
|-id=555 bgcolor=#E9E9E9
| 39555 ||  || — || March 2, 1992 || La Silla || UESAC || ADE || align=right | 5.6 km || 
|-id=556 bgcolor=#fefefe
| 39556 ||  || — || April 4, 1992 || La Silla || E. W. Elst || — || align=right | 3.3 km || 
|-id=557 bgcolor=#FA8072
| 39557 Gielgud || 1992 JG ||  || May 2, 1992 || Kitt Peak || Spacewatch || — || align=right | 1.2 km || 
|-id=558 bgcolor=#fefefe
| 39558 Kishine || 1992 KC ||  || May 24, 1992 || Geisei || T. Seki || FLO || align=right | 2.6 km || 
|-id=559 bgcolor=#fefefe
| 39559 ||  || — || July 22, 1992 || La Silla || H. Debehogne, Á. López-G. || NYS || align=right | 2.0 km || 
|-id=560 bgcolor=#fefefe
| 39560 ||  || — || August 2, 1992 || Palomar || H. E. Holt || FLO || align=right | 2.8 km || 
|-id=561 bgcolor=#FA8072
| 39561 || 1992 QA || — || August 19, 1992 || Siding Spring || R. H. McNaught || H || align=right | 2.7 km || 
|-id=562 bgcolor=#fefefe
| 39562 || 1992 QK || — || August 25, 1992 || Kiyosato || S. Otomo || V || align=right | 3.7 km || 
|-id=563 bgcolor=#fefefe
| 39563 || 1992 RB || — || September 2, 1992 || Siding Spring || R. H. McNaught || H || align=right | 1.6 km || 
|-id=564 bgcolor=#fefefe
| 39564 Tarsia ||  ||  || September 2, 1992 || La Silla || E. W. Elst || — || align=right | 1.9 km || 
|-id=565 bgcolor=#FFC2E0
| 39565 || 1992 SL || — || September 24, 1992 || Palomar || E. F. Helin, K. J. Lawrence || AMO || align=right data-sort-value="0.73" | 730 m || 
|-id=566 bgcolor=#fefefe
| 39566 Carllewis ||  ||  || September 26, 1992 || Geisei || T. Seki || — || align=right | 2.8 km || 
|-id=567 bgcolor=#fefefe
| 39567 ||  || — || September 22, 1992 || Palomar || E. F. Helin || — || align=right | 7.9 km || 
|-id=568 bgcolor=#fefefe
| 39568 ||  || — || September 24, 1992 || Kitt Peak || Spacewatch || — || align=right | 1.9 km || 
|-id=569 bgcolor=#fefefe
| 39569 ||  || — || September 24, 1992 || Kitt Peak || Spacewatch || NYS || align=right | 1.7 km || 
|-id=570 bgcolor=#fefefe
| 39570 ||  || — || September 28, 1992 || Kitt Peak || Spacewatch || V || align=right | 2.0 km || 
|-id=571 bgcolor=#fefefe
| 39571 Pückler ||  ||  || September 21, 1992 || Tautenburg Observatory || F. Börngen || V || align=right | 2.0 km || 
|-id=572 bgcolor=#FFC2E0
| 39572 ||  || — || February 26, 1993 || Kitt Peak || Spacewatch || AMO +1kmPHA || align=right | 1.6 km || 
|-id=573 bgcolor=#E9E9E9
| 39573 ||  || — || March 17, 1993 || La Silla || UESAC || ADE || align=right | 5.2 km || 
|-id=574 bgcolor=#E9E9E9
| 39574 ||  || — || March 17, 1993 || La Silla || UESAC || — || align=right | 6.2 km || 
|-id=575 bgcolor=#E9E9E9
| 39575 ||  || — || March 17, 1993 || La Silla || UESAC || — || align=right | 3.0 km || 
|-id=576 bgcolor=#E9E9E9
| 39576 ||  || — || March 17, 1993 || La Silla || UESAC || — || align=right | 3.5 km || 
|-id=577 bgcolor=#E9E9E9
| 39577 ||  || — || March 17, 1993 || La Silla || UESAC || JUN || align=right | 1.9 km || 
|-id=578 bgcolor=#E9E9E9
| 39578 ||  || — || March 17, 1993 || La Silla || UESAC || MAR || align=right | 5.0 km || 
|-id=579 bgcolor=#E9E9E9
| 39579 ||  || — || March 17, 1993 || La Silla || UESAC || — || align=right | 7.4 km || 
|-id=580 bgcolor=#E9E9E9
| 39580 ||  || — || March 17, 1993 || La Silla || UESAC || — || align=right | 2.4 km || 
|-id=581 bgcolor=#E9E9E9
| 39581 ||  || — || March 21, 1993 || La Silla || UESAC || HEN || align=right | 3.3 km || 
|-id=582 bgcolor=#E9E9E9
| 39582 ||  || — || March 21, 1993 || La Silla || UESAC || — || align=right | 4.7 km || 
|-id=583 bgcolor=#E9E9E9
| 39583 ||  || — || March 21, 1993 || La Silla || UESAC || — || align=right | 4.8 km || 
|-id=584 bgcolor=#E9E9E9
| 39584 ||  || — || March 21, 1993 || La Silla || UESAC || — || align=right | 4.3 km || 
|-id=585 bgcolor=#E9E9E9
| 39585 ||  || — || March 21, 1993 || La Silla || UESAC || — || align=right | 6.6 km || 
|-id=586 bgcolor=#E9E9E9
| 39586 ||  || — || March 21, 1993 || La Silla || UESAC || — || align=right | 4.7 km || 
|-id=587 bgcolor=#E9E9E9
| 39587 ||  || — || March 21, 1993 || La Silla || UESAC || NEM || align=right | 4.1 km || 
|-id=588 bgcolor=#E9E9E9
| 39588 ||  || — || March 19, 1993 || La Silla || UESAC || — || align=right | 5.5 km || 
|-id=589 bgcolor=#E9E9E9
| 39589 ||  || — || March 21, 1993 || La Silla || UESAC || — || align=right | 4.7 km || 
|-id=590 bgcolor=#E9E9E9
| 39590 ||  || — || March 21, 1993 || La Silla || UESAC || — || align=right | 5.7 km || 
|-id=591 bgcolor=#E9E9E9
| 39591 ||  || — || June 15, 1993 || Siding Spring || R. H. McNaught || — || align=right | 4.6 km || 
|-id=592 bgcolor=#fefefe
| 39592 ||  || — || July 20, 1993 || La Silla || E. W. Elst || — || align=right | 3.1 km || 
|-id=593 bgcolor=#d6d6d6
| 39593 ||  || — || July 20, 1993 || La Silla || E. W. Elst || THM || align=right | 4.9 km || 
|-id=594 bgcolor=#fefefe
| 39594 ||  || — || August 15, 1993 || Caussols || E. W. Elst || — || align=right | 2.2 km || 
|-id=595 bgcolor=#d6d6d6
| 39595 ||  || — || August 20, 1993 || La Silla || E. W. Elst || — || align=right | 3.9 km || 
|-id=596 bgcolor=#fefefe
| 39596 ||  || — || August 20, 1993 || La Silla || E. W. Elst || EUTslow || align=right | 1.8 km || 
|-id=597 bgcolor=#fefefe
| 39597 ||  || — || September 15, 1993 || La Silla || E. W. Elst || — || align=right | 2.6 km || 
|-id=598 bgcolor=#d6d6d6
| 39598 ||  || — || September 14, 1993 || La Silla || H. Debehogne, E. W. Elst || EOS || align=right | 4.6 km || 
|-id=599 bgcolor=#fefefe
| 39599 ||  || — || September 17, 1993 || La Silla || E. W. Elst || FLO || align=right | 1.6 km || 
|-id=600 bgcolor=#fefefe
| 39600 ||  || — || October 9, 1993 || La Silla || E. W. Elst || — || align=right | 3.1 km || 
|}

39601–39700 

|-bgcolor=#d6d6d6
| 39601 ||  || — || October 9, 1993 || La Silla || E. W. Elst || HYG || align=right | 7.3 km || 
|-id=602 bgcolor=#d6d6d6
| 39602 ||  || — || October 9, 1993 || La Silla || E. W. Elst || — || align=right | 7.0 km || 
|-id=603 bgcolor=#fefefe
| 39603 ||  || — || October 9, 1993 || La Silla || E. W. Elst || — || align=right | 3.0 km || 
|-id=604 bgcolor=#fefefe
| 39604 ||  || — || October 9, 1993 || La Silla || E. W. Elst || FLO || align=right | 3.3 km || 
|-id=605 bgcolor=#d6d6d6
| 39605 ||  || — || October 9, 1993 || La Silla || E. W. Elst || — || align=right | 6.4 km || 
|-id=606 bgcolor=#d6d6d6
| 39606 ||  || — || October 9, 1993 || La Silla || E. W. Elst || URS || align=right | 10 km || 
|-id=607 bgcolor=#d6d6d6
| 39607 ||  || — || October 9, 1993 || La Silla || E. W. Elst || — || align=right | 12 km || 
|-id=608 bgcolor=#fefefe
| 39608 ||  || — || October 9, 1993 || La Silla || E. W. Elst || — || align=right | 5.9 km || 
|-id=609 bgcolor=#fefefe
| 39609 ||  || — || October 9, 1993 || La Silla || E. W. Elst || — || align=right | 2.9 km || 
|-id=610 bgcolor=#fefefe
| 39610 ||  || — || October 9, 1993 || La Silla || E. W. Elst || FLO || align=right | 2.5 km || 
|-id=611 bgcolor=#fefefe
| 39611 ||  || — || October 20, 1993 || La Silla || E. W. Elst || FLO || align=right | 2.4 km || 
|-id=612 bgcolor=#fefefe
| 39612 ||  || — || December 5, 1993 || Nyukasa || M. Hirasawa, S. Suzuki || PHO || align=right | 3.0 km || 
|-id=613 bgcolor=#fefefe
| 39613 ||  || — || December 14, 1993 || Oizumi || T. Kobayashi || FLO || align=right | 1.5 km || 
|-id=614 bgcolor=#fefefe
| 39614 || 1993 YK || — || December 17, 1993 || Oizumi || T. Kobayashi || — || align=right | 2.5 km || 
|-id=615 bgcolor=#fefefe
| 39615 || 1994 AU || — || January 4, 1994 || Oizumi || T. Kobayashi || NYS || align=right | 1.9 km || 
|-id=616 bgcolor=#fefefe
| 39616 ||  || — || January 4, 1994 || Kitt Peak || Spacewatch || — || align=right | 2.2 km || 
|-id=617 bgcolor=#fefefe
| 39617 ||  || — || February 7, 1994 || La Silla || E. W. Elst || NYS || align=right | 2.9 km || 
|-id=618 bgcolor=#fefefe
| 39618 || 1994 LT || — || June 12, 1994 || Siding Spring || R. H. McNaught || Hslow || align=right | 2.0 km || 
|-id=619 bgcolor=#E9E9E9
| 39619 ||  || — || June 10, 1994 || Palomar || E. F. Helin || CLO || align=right | 6.3 km || 
|-id=620 bgcolor=#E9E9E9
| 39620 ||  || — || August 9, 1994 || Palomar || PCAS || — || align=right | 6.8 km || 
|-id=621 bgcolor=#d6d6d6
| 39621 ||  || — || August 10, 1994 || La Silla || E. W. Elst || — || align=right | 5.8 km || 
|-id=622 bgcolor=#E9E9E9
| 39622 ||  || — || August 10, 1994 || La Silla || E. W. Elst || — || align=right | 7.3 km || 
|-id=623 bgcolor=#E9E9E9
| 39623 ||  || — || August 10, 1994 || La Silla || E. W. Elst || — || align=right | 5.8 km || 
|-id=624 bgcolor=#E9E9E9
| 39624 ||  || — || August 10, 1994 || La Silla || E. W. Elst || — || align=right | 4.2 km || 
|-id=625 bgcolor=#d6d6d6
| 39625 ||  || — || August 10, 1994 || La Silla || E. W. Elst || — || align=right | 4.7 km || 
|-id=626 bgcolor=#d6d6d6
| 39626 ||  || — || August 12, 1994 || La Silla || E. W. Elst || — || align=right | 6.7 km || 
|-id=627 bgcolor=#E9E9E9
| 39627 ||  || — || August 12, 1994 || La Silla || E. W. Elst || — || align=right | 5.5 km || 
|-id=628 bgcolor=#E9E9E9
| 39628 ||  || — || August 12, 1994 || La Silla || E. W. Elst || HOF || align=right | 6.6 km || 
|-id=629 bgcolor=#E9E9E9
| 39629 ||  || — || August 12, 1994 || La Silla || E. W. Elst || — || align=right | 5.9 km || 
|-id=630 bgcolor=#E9E9E9
| 39630 ||  || — || August 10, 1994 || La Silla || E. W. Elst || GEF || align=right | 4.3 km || 
|-id=631 bgcolor=#E9E9E9
| 39631 ||  || — || September 28, 1994 || Kitt Peak || Spacewatch || — || align=right | 3.7 km || 
|-id=632 bgcolor=#d6d6d6
| 39632 || 1994 UL || — || October 31, 1994 || Oizumi || T. Kobayashi || — || align=right | 4.6 km || 
|-id=633 bgcolor=#d6d6d6
| 39633 || 1994 WO || — || November 25, 1994 || Oizumi || T. Kobayashi || — || align=right | 6.2 km || 
|-id=634 bgcolor=#d6d6d6
| 39634 ||  || — || November 28, 1994 || Kushiro || S. Ueda, H. Kaneda || — || align=right | 5.6 km || 
|-id=635 bgcolor=#d6d6d6
| 39635 Kusatao || 1994 YL ||  || December 27, 1994 || Kuma Kogen || A. Nakamura || — || align=right | 8.7 km || 
|-id=636 bgcolor=#d6d6d6
| 39636 ||  || — || January 29, 1995 || Siding Spring || R. H. McNaught || EUP || align=right | 10 km || 
|-id=637 bgcolor=#fefefe
| 39637 || 1995 EG || — || March 1, 1995 || Ojima || T. Niijima, T. Urata || — || align=right | 2.1 km || 
|-id=638 bgcolor=#E9E9E9
| 39638 ||  || — || March 2, 1995 || Kitt Peak || Spacewatch || — || align=right | 4.1 km || 
|-id=639 bgcolor=#fefefe
| 39639 ||  || — || March 23, 1995 || Kitt Peak || Spacewatch || — || align=right | 2.1 km || 
|-id=640 bgcolor=#fefefe
| 39640 ||  || — || April 4, 1995 || Xinglong || SCAP || — || align=right | 2.3 km || 
|-id=641 bgcolor=#fefefe
| 39641 ||  || — || May 29, 1995 || Stroncone || A. Vagnozzi || — || align=right | 2.5 km || 
|-id=642 bgcolor=#fefefe
| 39642 ||  || — || May 26, 1995 || Catalina Station || C. W. Hergenrother || PHO || align=right | 2.6 km || 
|-id=643 bgcolor=#fefefe
| 39643 ||  || — || May 26, 1995 || Kitt Peak || Spacewatch || — || align=right | 2.3 km || 
|-id=644 bgcolor=#d6d6d6
| 39644 ||  || — || July 24, 1995 || Kitt Peak || Spacewatch || — || align=right | 5.8 km || 
|-id=645 bgcolor=#fefefe
| 39645 Davelharris ||  ||  || August 31, 1995 || Socorro || R. Weber || V || align=right | 1.5 km || 
|-id=646 bgcolor=#E9E9E9
| 39646 ||  || — || September 26, 1995 || Catalina Station || T. B. Spahr || PAL || align=right | 5.4 km || 
|-id=647 bgcolor=#E9E9E9
| 39647 ||  || — || September 17, 1995 || Kitt Peak || Spacewatch || — || align=right | 1.9 km || 
|-id=648 bgcolor=#fefefe
| 39648 ||  || — || September 18, 1995 || Kitt Peak || Spacewatch || — || align=right | 1.5 km || 
|-id=649 bgcolor=#E9E9E9
| 39649 ||  || — || September 18, 1995 || Kitt Peak || Spacewatch || — || align=right | 4.6 km || 
|-id=650 bgcolor=#E9E9E9
| 39650 ||  || — || September 25, 1995 || Kitt Peak || Spacewatch || — || align=right | 2.7 km || 
|-id=651 bgcolor=#d6d6d6
| 39651 ||  || — || September 29, 1995 || Kitt Peak || Spacewatch || — || align=right | 7.7 km || 
|-id=652 bgcolor=#E9E9E9
| 39652 ||  || — || October 15, 1995 || Kitt Peak || Spacewatch || — || align=right | 2.8 km || 
|-id=653 bgcolor=#E9E9E9
| 39653 Carnera || 1995 UC ||  || October 17, 1995 || Sormano || P. Sicoli, P. Ghezzi || — || align=right | 6.4 km || 
|-id=654 bgcolor=#fefefe
| 39654 || 1995 UP || — || October 19, 1995 || Sormano || V. Giuliani, A. Testa || FLO || align=right | 2.0 km || 
|-id=655 bgcolor=#E9E9E9
| 39655 Muneharuasada ||  ||  || October 17, 1995 || Nanyo || T. Okuni || — || align=right | 2.9 km || 
|-id=656 bgcolor=#E9E9E9
| 39656 ||  || — || October 17, 1995 || Kitt Peak || Spacewatch || MIT || align=right | 6.2 km || 
|-id=657 bgcolor=#E9E9E9
| 39657 ||  || — || October 19, 1995 || Kitt Peak || Spacewatch || HEN || align=right | 2.1 km || 
|-id=658 bgcolor=#E9E9E9
| 39658 ||  || — || October 19, 1995 || Kitt Peak || Spacewatch || — || align=right | 3.4 km || 
|-id=659 bgcolor=#E9E9E9
| 39659 ||  || — || October 26, 1995 || Nyukasa || M. Hirasawa, S. Suzuki || MAR || align=right | 3.8 km || 
|-id=660 bgcolor=#E9E9E9
| 39660 ||  || — || October 20, 1995 || Caussols || E. W. Elst || — || align=right | 4.0 km || 
|-id=661 bgcolor=#E9E9E9
| 39661 ||  || — || October 25, 1995 || Kitt Peak || Spacewatch || — || align=right | 2.3 km || 
|-id=662 bgcolor=#E9E9E9
| 39662 ||  || — || November 14, 1995 || Kitt Peak || Spacewatch || — || align=right | 2.6 km || 
|-id=663 bgcolor=#E9E9E9
| 39663 ||  || — || November 16, 1995 || Church Stretton || S. P. Laurie || — || align=right | 3.8 km || 
|-id=664 bgcolor=#E9E9E9
| 39664 ||  || — || November 20, 1995 || Ojima || T. Niijima, T. Urata || — || align=right | 4.4 km || 
|-id=665 bgcolor=#fefefe
| 39665 ||  || — || November 16, 1995 || Kushiro || S. Ueda, H. Kaneda || H || align=right | 1.6 km || 
|-id=666 bgcolor=#E9E9E9
| 39666 ||  || — || November 20, 1995 || Kitt Peak || Spacewatch || — || align=right | 6.4 km || 
|-id=667 bgcolor=#d6d6d6
| 39667 ||  || — || December 22, 1995 || Oohira || T. Urata || — || align=right | 2.9 km || 
|-id=668 bgcolor=#E9E9E9
| 39668 ||  || — || December 16, 1995 || Kitt Peak || Spacewatch || PAD || align=right | 3.3 km || 
|-id=669 bgcolor=#d6d6d6
| 39669 ||  || — || December 18, 1995 || Kitt Peak || Spacewatch || — || align=right | 6.4 km || 
|-id=670 bgcolor=#E9E9E9
| 39670 ||  || — || December 22, 1995 || Kitt Peak || Spacewatch || — || align=right | 3.2 km || 
|-id=671 bgcolor=#d6d6d6
| 39671 || 1996 AG || — || January 7, 1996 || Haleakala || AMOS || — || align=right | 8.4 km || 
|-id=672 bgcolor=#E9E9E9
| 39672 ||  || — || January 22, 1996 || Cloudcroft || W. Offutt || NEM || align=right | 7.0 km || 
|-id=673 bgcolor=#d6d6d6
| 39673 ||  || — || January 27, 1996 || Oizumi || T. Kobayashi || EOS || align=right | 6.8 km || 
|-id=674 bgcolor=#d6d6d6
| 39674 ||  || — || January 16, 1996 || Kitt Peak || Spacewatch || — || align=right | 7.1 km || 
|-id=675 bgcolor=#d6d6d6
| 39675 ||  || — || January 19, 1996 || Kitt Peak || Spacewatch || — || align=right | 6.4 km || 
|-id=676 bgcolor=#d6d6d6
| 39676 ||  || — || February 20, 1996 || Church Stretton || S. P. Laurie || — || align=right | 11 km || 
|-id=677 bgcolor=#d6d6d6
| 39677 Anagaribaldi || 1996 EG ||  || March 13, 1996 || Stroncone || Santa Lucia Obs. || — || align=right | 10 km || 
|-id=678 bgcolor=#fefefe
| 39678 Ammannito ||  ||  || June 12, 1996 || San Marcello || A. Boattini, L. Tesi || FLO || align=right | 1.2 km || 
|-id=679 bgcolor=#fefefe
| 39679 Nukuhiyama ||  ||  || July 19, 1996 || Nanyo || T. Okuni || — || align=right | 2.5 km || 
|-id=680 bgcolor=#E9E9E9
| 39680 ||  || — || August 9, 1996 || Haleakala || NEAT || — || align=right | 4.2 km || 
|-id=681 bgcolor=#fefefe
| 39681 ||  || — || August 15, 1996 || Haleakala || NEAT || PHO || align=right | 2.6 km || 
|-id=682 bgcolor=#fefefe
| 39682 ||  || — || August 10, 1996 || Haleakala || NEAT || — || align=right | 2.3 km || 
|-id=683 bgcolor=#fefefe
| 39683 ||  || — || August 12, 1996 || Haleakala || NEAT || — || align=right | 2.7 km || 
|-id=684 bgcolor=#d6d6d6
| 39684 ||  || — || August 8, 1996 || La Silla || E. W. Elst || KOR || align=right | 4.5 km || 
|-id=685 bgcolor=#fefefe
| 39685 ||  || — || August 8, 1996 || La Silla || E. W. Elst || — || align=right | 2.5 km || 
|-id=686 bgcolor=#E9E9E9
| 39686 Takeshihara ||  ||  || August 9, 1996 || Nanyo || T. Okuni || HOF || align=right | 10 km || 
|-id=687 bgcolor=#fefefe
| 39687 ||  || — || September 15, 1996 || Prescott || P. G. Comba || slow? || align=right | 2.2 km || 
|-id=688 bgcolor=#fefefe
| 39688 ||  || — || September 3, 1996 || Nachi-Katsuura || H. Shiozawa, T. Urata || — || align=right | 3.4 km || 
|-id=689 bgcolor=#fefefe
| 39689 ||  || — || September 8, 1996 || Kitt Peak || Spacewatch || MAS || align=right | 1.7 km || 
|-id=690 bgcolor=#fefefe
| 39690 ||  || — || September 14, 1996 || Haleakala || NEAT || FLO || align=right | 1.4 km || 
|-id=691 bgcolor=#C2FFFF
| 39691 ||  || — || September 13, 1996 || La Silla || UDTS || L4 || align=right | 12 km || 
|-id=692 bgcolor=#C2FFFF
| 39692 ||  || — || September 14, 1996 || La Silla || UDTS || L4 || align=right | 13 km || 
|-id=693 bgcolor=#C2FFFF
| 39693 ||  || — || September 17, 1996 || Kitt Peak || Spacewatch || L4 || align=right | 15 km || 
|-id=694 bgcolor=#fefefe
| 39694 ||  || — || September 19, 1996 || Kitt Peak || Spacewatch || ERI || align=right | 3.6 km || 
|-id=695 bgcolor=#fefefe
| 39695 ||  || — || September 18, 1996 || Xinglong || SCAP || V || align=right | 1.9 km || 
|-id=696 bgcolor=#E9E9E9
| 39696 ||  || — || October 7, 1996 || Needville || W. G. Dillon, K. Rivich || — || align=right | 2.5 km || 
|-id=697 bgcolor=#fefefe
| 39697 ||  || — || October 9, 1996 || Prescott || P. G. Comba || NYS || align=right | 1.5 km || 
|-id=698 bgcolor=#fefefe
| 39698 ||  || — || October 4, 1996 || Farra d'Isonzo || Farra d'Isonzo || FLO || align=right | 1.8 km || 
|-id=699 bgcolor=#fefefe
| 39699 Ernestocorte ||  ||  || October 12, 1996 || Pianoro || V. Goretti || NYS || align=right | 1.9 km || 
|-id=700 bgcolor=#E9E9E9
| 39700 ||  || — || October 12, 1996 || Lake Clear || K. A. Williams || HNS || align=right | 3.0 km || 
|}

39701–39800 

|-bgcolor=#fefefe
| 39701 ||  || — || October 9, 1996 || Kushiro || S. Ueda, H. Kaneda || — || align=right | 3.7 km || 
|-id=702 bgcolor=#FA8072
| 39702 ||  || — || October 9, 1996 || Kushiro || S. Ueda, H. Kaneda || — || align=right | 2.5 km || 
|-id=703 bgcolor=#fefefe
| 39703 ||  || — || October 14, 1996 || Kitami || K. Endate, K. Watanabe || — || align=right | 3.2 km || 
|-id=704 bgcolor=#fefefe
| 39704 ||  || — || October 9, 1996 || Kushiro || S. Ueda, H. Kaneda || NYS || align=right | 2.3 km || 
|-id=705 bgcolor=#fefefe
| 39705 ||  || — || October 4, 1996 || Kitt Peak || Spacewatch || slow || align=right | 2.7 km || 
|-id=706 bgcolor=#fefefe
| 39706 ||  || — || October 9, 1996 || Kitt Peak || Spacewatch || — || align=right | 2.4 km || 
|-id=707 bgcolor=#fefefe
| 39707 ||  || — || October 11, 1996 || Kitt Peak || Spacewatch || — || align=right | 3.8 km || 
|-id=708 bgcolor=#fefefe
| 39708 ||  || — || October 10, 1996 || Kitt Peak || Spacewatch || V || align=right | 1.7 km || 
|-id=709 bgcolor=#fefefe
| 39709 ||  || — || October 9, 1996 || Kushiro || S. Ueda, H. Kaneda || NYS || align=right | 2.5 km || 
|-id=710 bgcolor=#fefefe
| 39710 ||  || — || October 4, 1996 || La Silla || E. W. Elst || NYS || align=right | 2.0 km || 
|-id=711 bgcolor=#fefefe
| 39711 ||  || — || October 5, 1996 || La Silla || E. W. Elst || PHO || align=right | 2.9 km || 
|-id=712 bgcolor=#fefefe
| 39712 Ehimedaigaku ||  ||  || October 14, 1996 || Geisei || T. Seki || NYS || align=right | 2.8 km || 
|-id=713 bgcolor=#fefefe
| 39713 ||  || — || October 2, 1996 || La Silla || E. W. Elst || V || align=right | 2.2 km || 
|-id=714 bgcolor=#fefefe
| 39714 ||  || — || October 16, 1996 || Kitt Peak || Spacewatch || — || align=right | 2.4 km || 
|-id=715 bgcolor=#fefefe
| 39715 || 1996 VT || — || November 2, 1996 || Prescott || P. G. Comba || — || align=right | 2.1 km || 
|-id=716 bgcolor=#E9E9E9
| 39716 ||  || — || November 6, 1996 || Oizumi || T. Kobayashi || — || align=right | 3.1 km || 
|-id=717 bgcolor=#E9E9E9
| 39717 ||  || — || November 6, 1996 || Oizumi || T. Kobayashi || — || align=right | 5.4 km || 
|-id=718 bgcolor=#fefefe
| 39718 ||  || — || November 12, 1996 || Sudbury || D. di Cicco || — || align=right | 2.6 km || 
|-id=719 bgcolor=#fefefe
| 39719 ||  || — || November 8, 1996 || Xinglong || SCAP || NYS || align=right | 1.9 km || 
|-id=720 bgcolor=#fefefe
| 39720 ||  || — || November 8, 1996 || Xinglong || SCAP || NYS || align=right | 2.1 km || 
|-id=721 bgcolor=#fefefe
| 39721 ||  || — || November 15, 1996 || Nachi-Katsuura || Y. Shimizu, T. Urata || NYS || align=right | 3.2 km || 
|-id=722 bgcolor=#fefefe
| 39722 ||  || — || November 3, 1996 || Kushiro || S. Ueda, H. Kaneda || NYS || align=right | 4.7 km || 
|-id=723 bgcolor=#E9E9E9
| 39723 ||  || — || November 7, 1996 || Kitami || K. Endate, K. Watanabe || — || align=right | 8.3 km || 
|-id=724 bgcolor=#fefefe
| 39724 ||  || — || November 4, 1996 || Kitt Peak || Spacewatch || V || align=right | 2.0 km || 
|-id=725 bgcolor=#E9E9E9
| 39725 ||  || — || November 2, 1996 || Xinglong || SCAP || — || align=right | 2.5 km || 
|-id=726 bgcolor=#E9E9E9
| 39726 Hideyukitezuka ||  ||  || November 10, 1996 || Nanyo || T. Okuni || — || align=right | 3.8 km || 
|-id=727 bgcolor=#fefefe
| 39727 ||  || — || November 7, 1996 || Xinglong || SCAP || NYS || align=right | 2.3 km || 
|-id=728 bgcolor=#fefefe
| 39728 || 1996 WG || — || November 17, 1996 || Sudbury || D. di Cicco || — || align=right | 2.5 km || 
|-id=729 bgcolor=#fefefe
| 39729 || 1996 XD || — || December 1, 1996 || Oohira || T. Urata || NYS || align=right | 2.2 km || 
|-id=730 bgcolor=#fefefe
| 39730 ||  || — || December 7, 1996 || Oizumi || T. Kobayashi || NYS || align=right | 2.0 km || 
|-id=731 bgcolor=#E9E9E9
| 39731 ||  || — || December 9, 1996 || Kitt Peak || Spacewatch || — || align=right | 2.4 km || 
|-id=732 bgcolor=#d6d6d6
| 39732 ||  || — || December 7, 1996 || Kitt Peak || Spacewatch || ALA || align=right | 7.5 km || 
|-id=733 bgcolor=#E9E9E9
| 39733 ||  || — || December 7, 1996 || Kitt Peak || Spacewatch || MAR || align=right | 3.5 km || 
|-id=734 bgcolor=#fefefe
| 39734 Marchiori ||  ||  || December 14, 1996 || Sormano || F. Manca, P. Chiavenna || NYS || align=right | 1.9 km || 
|-id=735 bgcolor=#E9E9E9
| 39735 ||  || — || December 20, 1996 || Xinglong || SCAP || — || align=right | 4.9 km || 
|-id=736 bgcolor=#E9E9E9
| 39736 || 1997 AM || — || January 2, 1997 || Oizumi || T. Kobayashi || — || align=right | 2.9 km || 
|-id=737 bgcolor=#E9E9E9
| 39737 ||  || — || January 2, 1997 || Oizumi || T. Kobayashi || — || align=right | 3.6 km || 
|-id=738 bgcolor=#E9E9E9
| 39738 ||  || — || January 3, 1997 || Oizumi || T. Kobayashi || — || align=right | 2.5 km || 
|-id=739 bgcolor=#E9E9E9
| 39739 ||  || — || January 3, 1997 || Oizumi || T. Kobayashi || — || align=right | 4.4 km || 
|-id=740 bgcolor=#E9E9E9
| 39740 ||  || — || January 6, 1997 || Oizumi || T. Kobayashi || — || align=right | 3.5 km || 
|-id=741 bgcolor=#FA8072
| 39741 Komm ||  ||  || January 9, 1997 || Goodricke-Pigott || R. A. Tucker || — || align=right | 2.2 km || 
|-id=742 bgcolor=#fefefe
| 39742 ||  || — || January 5, 1997 || Xinglong || SCAP || NYS || align=right | 4.3 km || 
|-id=743 bgcolor=#E9E9E9
| 39743 ||  || — || January 3, 1997 || Kitt Peak || Spacewatch || — || align=right | 2.2 km || 
|-id=744 bgcolor=#fefefe
| 39744 ||  || — || January 14, 1997 || Oizumi || T. Kobayashi || NYS || align=right | 2.6 km || 
|-id=745 bgcolor=#E9E9E9
| 39745 ||  || — || January 14, 1997 || Haleakala || NEAT || BRG || align=right | 5.5 km || 
|-id=746 bgcolor=#E9E9E9
| 39746 || 1997 BW || — || January 18, 1997 || Xinglong || SCAP || EUN || align=right | 3.7 km || 
|-id=747 bgcolor=#E9E9E9
| 39747 ||  || — || January 29, 1997 || Sudbury || D. di Cicco || — || align=right | 4.7 km || 
|-id=748 bgcolor=#E9E9E9
| 39748 Guccini ||  ||  || January 28, 1997 || San Marcello || L. Tesi, G. Cattani || BRG || align=right | 3.9 km || 
|-id=749 bgcolor=#E9E9E9
| 39749 ||  || — || January 28, 1997 || Church Stretton || S. P. Laurie || — || align=right | 2.5 km || 
|-id=750 bgcolor=#E9E9E9
| 39750 ||  || — || February 2, 1997 || Kitt Peak || Spacewatch || HEN || align=right | 2.3 km || 
|-id=751 bgcolor=#E9E9E9
| 39751 ||  || — || February 3, 1997 || Oizumi || T. Kobayashi || WIT || align=right | 4.2 km || 
|-id=752 bgcolor=#E9E9E9
| 39752 ||  || — || February 6, 1997 || Haleakala || NEAT || MIS || align=right | 6.0 km || 
|-id=753 bgcolor=#E9E9E9
| 39753 ||  || — || February 1, 1997 || Kitt Peak || Spacewatch || — || align=right | 4.6 km || 
|-id=754 bgcolor=#E9E9E9
| 39754 ||  || — || February 4, 1997 || Kitt Peak || Spacewatch || — || align=right | 3.6 km || 
|-id=755 bgcolor=#E9E9E9
| 39755 ||  || — || February 13, 1997 || Oizumi || T. Kobayashi || EUN || align=right | 2.6 km || 
|-id=756 bgcolor=#E9E9E9
| 39756 ||  || — || March 7, 1997 || Kitt Peak || Spacewatch || — || align=right | 4.4 km || 
|-id=757 bgcolor=#E9E9E9
| 39757 ||  || — || March 7, 1997 || Kitt Peak || Spacewatch || — || align=right | 2.9 km || 
|-id=758 bgcolor=#d6d6d6
| 39758 ||  || — || March 5, 1997 || Kitt Peak || Spacewatch || 628 || align=right | 4.8 km || 
|-id=759 bgcolor=#E9E9E9
| 39759 ||  || — || March 10, 1997 || Socorro || LINEAR || EUN || align=right | 4.9 km || 
|-id=760 bgcolor=#fefefe
| 39760 ||  || — || March 8, 1997 || La Silla || E. W. Elst || FLO || align=right | 1.5 km || 
|-id=761 bgcolor=#E9E9E9
| 39761 ||  || — || March 2, 1997 || Kitt Peak || Spacewatch || GER || align=right | 4.4 km || 
|-id=762 bgcolor=#E9E9E9
| 39762 ||  || — || March 29, 1997 || Xinglong || SCAP || PAD || align=right | 6.6 km || 
|-id=763 bgcolor=#E9E9E9
| 39763 ||  || — || March 31, 1997 || Socorro || LINEAR || — || align=right | 6.5 km || 
|-id=764 bgcolor=#E9E9E9
| 39764 ||  || — || March 31, 1997 || Socorro || LINEAR || — || align=right | 6.1 km || 
|-id=765 bgcolor=#E9E9E9
| 39765 ||  || — || April 7, 1997 || Kitt Peak || Spacewatch || — || align=right | 4.6 km || 
|-id=766 bgcolor=#d6d6d6
| 39766 ||  || — || April 2, 1997 || Socorro || LINEAR || — || align=right | 5.7 km || 
|-id=767 bgcolor=#fefefe
| 39767 ||  || — || April 3, 1997 || Socorro || LINEAR || V || align=right | 2.4 km || 
|-id=768 bgcolor=#d6d6d6
| 39768 ||  || — || April 3, 1997 || Socorro || LINEAR || — || align=right | 5.1 km || 
|-id=769 bgcolor=#fefefe
| 39769 ||  || — || April 3, 1997 || Socorro || LINEAR || — || align=right | 3.7 km || 
|-id=770 bgcolor=#d6d6d6
| 39770 ||  || — || April 3, 1997 || Socorro || LINEAR || KOR || align=right | 3.2 km || 
|-id=771 bgcolor=#d6d6d6
| 39771 ||  || — || April 6, 1997 || Socorro || LINEAR || EMA || align=right | 7.4 km || 
|-id=772 bgcolor=#d6d6d6
| 39772 ||  || — || April 6, 1997 || Socorro || LINEAR || — || align=right | 7.1 km || 
|-id=773 bgcolor=#d6d6d6
| 39773 ||  || — || April 6, 1997 || Socorro || LINEAR || — || align=right | 5.3 km || 
|-id=774 bgcolor=#FA8072
| 39774 ||  || — || April 12, 1997 || Kitt Peak || Spacewatch || — || align=right data-sort-value="0.61" | 610 m || 
|-id=775 bgcolor=#E9E9E9
| 39775 ||  || — || April 13, 1997 || Xinglong || SCAP || — || align=right | 4.5 km || 
|-id=776 bgcolor=#d6d6d6
| 39776 ||  || — || April 3, 1997 || Socorro || LINEAR || KOR || align=right | 3.4 km || 
|-id=777 bgcolor=#E9E9E9
| 39777 || 1997 HE || — || April 27, 1997 || Kitt Peak || Spacewatch || — || align=right | 4.2 km || 
|-id=778 bgcolor=#d6d6d6
| 39778 ||  || — || April 30, 1997 || Socorro || LINEAR || — || align=right | 6.9 km || 
|-id=779 bgcolor=#d6d6d6
| 39779 ||  || — || April 30, 1997 || Socorro || LINEAR || — || align=right | 5.6 km || 
|-id=780 bgcolor=#d6d6d6
| 39780 ||  || — || April 30, 1997 || Socorro || LINEAR || KOR || align=right | 3.2 km || 
|-id=781 bgcolor=#d6d6d6
| 39781 ||  || — || April 30, 1997 || Socorro || LINEAR || — || align=right | 5.3 km || 
|-id=782 bgcolor=#d6d6d6
| 39782 ||  || — || May 3, 1997 || La Silla || E. W. Elst || — || align=right | 7.1 km || 
|-id=783 bgcolor=#d6d6d6
| 39783 ||  || — || June 1, 1997 || Kitt Peak || Spacewatch || fast? || align=right | 8.9 km || 
|-id=784 bgcolor=#d6d6d6
| 39784 ||  || — || June 2, 1997 || Kitt Peak || Spacewatch || — || align=right | 6.3 km || 
|-id=785 bgcolor=#d6d6d6
| 39785 ||  || — || June 7, 1997 || La Silla || E. W. Elst || — || align=right | 6.4 km || 
|-id=786 bgcolor=#d6d6d6
| 39786 ||  || — || June 8, 1997 || La Silla || E. W. Elst || HYG || align=right | 7.1 km || 
|-id=787 bgcolor=#fefefe
| 39787 ||  || — || June 28, 1997 || Socorro || LINEAR || H || align=right | 1.3 km || 
|-id=788 bgcolor=#d6d6d6
| 39788 ||  || — || June 28, 1997 || Kitt Peak || Spacewatch || — || align=right | 8.6 km || 
|-id=789 bgcolor=#d6d6d6
| 39789 || 1997 OA || — || July 23, 1997 || Lake Clear || K. A. Williams || ALA || align=right | 18 km || 
|-id=790 bgcolor=#d6d6d6
| 39790 || 1997 PF || — || August 1, 1997 || Haleakala || NEAT || — || align=right | 11 km || 
|-id=791 bgcolor=#fefefe
| 39791 Jameshesser ||  ||  || August 13, 1997 || NRC-DAO || D. D. Balam || H || align=right | 1.6 km || 
|-id=792 bgcolor=#fefefe
| 39792 Patrickchevalley ||  ||  || September 5, 1997 || Caussols || ODAS || — || align=right | 1.4 km || 
|-id=793 bgcolor=#C2FFFF
| 39793 ||  || — || September 29, 1997 || Kitt Peak || Spacewatch || L4 || align=right | 12 km || 
|-id=794 bgcolor=#C2FFFF
| 39794 ||  || — || September 30, 1997 || Kitt Peak || Spacewatch || L4 || align=right | 20 km || 
|-id=795 bgcolor=#C2FFFF
| 39795 Marson ||  ||  || September 30, 1997 || Kitt Peak || Spacewatch || L4ERY || align=right | 18 km || 
|-id=796 bgcolor=#FFC2E0
| 39796 || 1997 TD || — || October 1, 1997 || Haleakala || NEAT || AMO +1kmslow || align=right | 2.1 km || 
|-id=797 bgcolor=#C2FFFF
| 39797 ||  || — || October 3, 1997 || Xinglong || SCAP || L4 || align=right | 19 km || 
|-id=798 bgcolor=#C2FFFF
| 39798 ||  || — || October 6, 1997 || La Silla || UDTS || L4 || align=right | 12 km || 
|-id=799 bgcolor=#fefefe
| 39799 Hadano ||  ||  || October 23, 1997 || Hadano Obs. || A. Asami || — || align=right | 2.8 km || 
|-id=800 bgcolor=#fefefe
| 39800 ||  || — || October 23, 1997 || Kitt Peak || Spacewatch || NYS || align=right | 1.1 km || 
|}

39801–39900 

|-bgcolor=#fefefe
| 39801 ||  || — || October 23, 1997 || Kitt Peak || Spacewatch || — || align=right | 1.3 km || 
|-id=802 bgcolor=#fefefe
| 39802 Ivanhlinka ||  ||  || October 29, 1997 || Ondřejov || L. Kotková || — || align=right | 1.9 km || 
|-id=803 bgcolor=#C2FFFF
| 39803 ||  || — || October 23, 1997 || Kitt Peak || Spacewatch || L4 || align=right | 14 km || 
|-id=804 bgcolor=#fefefe
| 39804 ||  || — || November 8, 1997 || Oizumi || T. Kobayashi || — || align=right | 1.8 km || 
|-id=805 bgcolor=#fefefe
| 39805 ||  || — || November 23, 1997 || Oizumi || T. Kobayashi || — || align=right | 1.9 km || 
|-id=806 bgcolor=#fefefe
| 39806 ||  || — || November 23, 1997 || Oizumi || T. Kobayashi || — || align=right | 2.0 km || 
|-id=807 bgcolor=#fefefe
| 39807 ||  || — || November 24, 1997 || Kitt Peak || Spacewatch || — || align=right | 2.5 km || 
|-id=808 bgcolor=#fefefe
| 39808 ||  || — || November 25, 1997 || Zeno || T. Stafford || — || align=right | 2.0 km || 
|-id=809 bgcolor=#fefefe
| 39809 Fukuchan ||  ||  || November 30, 1997 || Geisei || T. Seki || — || align=right | 1.5 km || 
|-id=810 bgcolor=#fefefe
| 39810 ||  || — || November 29, 1997 || Socorro || LINEAR || PHO || align=right | 4.7 km || 
|-id=811 bgcolor=#fefefe
| 39811 ||  || — || November 29, 1997 || Socorro || LINEAR || — || align=right | 2.3 km || 
|-id=812 bgcolor=#fefefe
| 39812 ||  || — || November 29, 1997 || Socorro || LINEAR || FLO || align=right | 2.5 km || 
|-id=813 bgcolor=#fefefe
| 39813 ||  || — || December 6, 1997 || Caussols || ODAS || — || align=right | 2.9 km || 
|-id=814 bgcolor=#E9E9E9
| 39814 Christianlegrand ||  ||  || December 7, 1997 || Caussols || ODAS || — || align=right | 3.3 km || 
|-id=815 bgcolor=#fefefe
| 39815 ||  || — || December 4, 1997 || Xinglong || SCAP || — || align=right | 1.9 km || 
|-id=816 bgcolor=#fefefe
| 39816 ||  || — || December 10, 1997 || Xinglong || SCAP || — || align=right | 3.5 km || 
|-id=817 bgcolor=#fefefe
| 39817 || 1997 YN || — || December 20, 1997 || Oizumi || T. Kobayashi || FLO || align=right | 3.3 km || 
|-id=818 bgcolor=#fefefe
| 39818 ||  || — || December 24, 1997 || Chichibu || N. Satō || FLO || align=right | 2.0 km || 
|-id=819 bgcolor=#E9E9E9
| 39819 ||  || — || December 28, 1997 || Oizumi || T. Kobayashi || EUN || align=right | 3.8 km || 
|-id=820 bgcolor=#fefefe
| 39820 ||  || — || December 31, 1997 || Kitt Peak || Spacewatch || — || align=right | 1.4 km || 
|-id=821 bgcolor=#fefefe
| 39821 ||  || — || January 5, 1998 || Xinglong || SCAP || FLO || align=right | 4.7 km || 
|-id=822 bgcolor=#fefefe
| 39822 || 1998 BO || — || January 18, 1998 || Oizumi || T. Kobayashi || FLO || align=right | 2.8 km || 
|-id=823 bgcolor=#fefefe
| 39823 || 1998 BV || — || January 19, 1998 || Oizumi || T. Kobayashi || — || align=right | 3.0 km || 
|-id=824 bgcolor=#E9E9E9
| 39824 ||  || — || January 19, 1998 || Oizumi || T. Kobayashi || — || align=right | 2.9 km || 
|-id=825 bgcolor=#fefefe
| 39825 ||  || — || January 20, 1998 || Socorro || LINEAR || — || align=right | 3.0 km || 
|-id=826 bgcolor=#fefefe
| 39826 ||  || — || January 19, 1998 || Nachi-Katsuura || Y. Shimizu, T. Urata || — || align=right | 2.6 km || 
|-id=827 bgcolor=#fefefe
| 39827 ||  || — || January 19, 1998 || Prescott || P. G. Comba || — || align=right | 2.5 km || 
|-id=828 bgcolor=#fefefe
| 39828 ||  || — || January 21, 1998 || Nachi-Katsuura || Y. Shimizu, T. Urata || — || align=right | 2.4 km || 
|-id=829 bgcolor=#fefefe
| 39829 ||  || — || January 17, 1998 || Caussols || ODAS || V || align=right | 1.6 km || 
|-id=830 bgcolor=#fefefe
| 39830 ||  || — || January 24, 1998 || Oizumi || T. Kobayashi || — || align=right | 3.0 km || 
|-id=831 bgcolor=#fefefe
| 39831 ||  || — || January 24, 1998 || Oizumi || T. Kobayashi || — || align=right | 2.2 km || 
|-id=832 bgcolor=#fefefe
| 39832 ||  || — || January 24, 1998 || Haleakala || NEAT || V || align=right | 2.1 km || 
|-id=833 bgcolor=#fefefe
| 39833 ||  || — || January 25, 1998 || Oizumi || T. Kobayashi || — || align=right | 2.8 km || 
|-id=834 bgcolor=#d6d6d6
| 39834 ||  || — || January 23, 1998 || Socorro || LINEAR || EOS || align=right | 7.5 km || 
|-id=835 bgcolor=#fefefe
| 39835 ||  || — || January 24, 1998 || Socorro || LINEAR || — || align=right | 2.3 km || 
|-id=836 bgcolor=#fefefe
| 39836 ||  || — || January 22, 1998 || Kitt Peak || Spacewatch || — || align=right | 2.1 km || 
|-id=837 bgcolor=#E9E9E9
| 39837 ||  || — || January 22, 1998 || Kitt Peak || Spacewatch || — || align=right | 1.8 km || 
|-id=838 bgcolor=#fefefe
| 39838 ||  || — || January 26, 1998 || Farra d'Isonzo || Farra d'Isonzo || V || align=right | 2.1 km || 
|-id=839 bgcolor=#fefefe
| 39839 ||  || — || January 18, 1998 || Kitt Peak || Spacewatch || EUT || align=right | 1.4 km || 
|-id=840 bgcolor=#fefefe
| 39840 ||  || — || January 26, 1998 || Kitt Peak || Spacewatch || — || align=right | 3.8 km || 
|-id=841 bgcolor=#fefefe
| 39841 ||  || — || January 28, 1998 || Oizumi || T. Kobayashi || NYS || align=right | 2.1 km || 
|-id=842 bgcolor=#fefefe
| 39842 ||  || — || January 29, 1998 || Zeno || T. Stafford || V || align=right | 2.3 km || 
|-id=843 bgcolor=#fefefe
| 39843 ||  || — || January 29, 1998 || Oizumi || T. Kobayashi || — || align=right | 4.0 km || 
|-id=844 bgcolor=#fefefe
| 39844 ||  || — || January 29, 1998 || Kitt Peak || Spacewatch || — || align=right | 2.3 km || 
|-id=845 bgcolor=#fefefe
| 39845 ||  || — || January 28, 1998 || Kitt Peak || Spacewatch || FLO || align=right | 5.0 km || 
|-id=846 bgcolor=#fefefe
| 39846 ||  || — || January 26, 1998 || Kitt Peak || Spacewatch || — || align=right | 3.5 km || 
|-id=847 bgcolor=#E9E9E9
| 39847 ||  || — || January 20, 1998 || Socorro || LINEAR || — || align=right | 3.4 km || 
|-id=848 bgcolor=#fefefe
| 39848 ||  || — || January 22, 1998 || Kitt Peak || Spacewatch || — || align=right | 2.3 km || 
|-id=849 bgcolor=#fefefe
| 39849 Giampieri ||  ||  || February 13, 1998 || San Marcello || L. Tesi, A. Boattini || — || align=right | 2.1 km || 
|-id=850 bgcolor=#fefefe
| 39850 ||  || — || February 6, 1998 || La Silla || E. W. Elst || — || align=right | 3.3 km || 
|-id=851 bgcolor=#fefefe
| 39851 ||  || — || February 6, 1998 || La Silla || E. W. Elst || MAS || align=right | 2.2 km || 
|-id=852 bgcolor=#fefefe
| 39852 ||  || — || February 6, 1998 || La Silla || E. W. Elst || V || align=right | 1.9 km || 
|-id=853 bgcolor=#fefefe
| 39853 ||  || — || February 6, 1998 || La Silla || E. W. Elst || NYS || align=right | 1.8 km || 
|-id=854 bgcolor=#fefefe
| 39854 Gabriopiola ||  ||  || February 20, 1998 || Bologna || San Vittore Obs. || — || align=right | 2.3 km || 
|-id=855 bgcolor=#fefefe
| 39855 ||  || — || February 22, 1998 || Haleakala || NEAT || — || align=right | 5.5 km || 
|-id=856 bgcolor=#fefefe
| 39856 ||  || — || February 22, 1998 || Haleakala || NEAT || — || align=right | 2.2 km || 
|-id=857 bgcolor=#fefefe
| 39857 ||  || — || February 22, 1998 || Haleakala || NEAT || — || align=right | 2.3 km || 
|-id=858 bgcolor=#E9E9E9
| 39858 ||  || — || February 22, 1998 || Haleakala || NEAT || — || align=right | 3.4 km || 
|-id=859 bgcolor=#fefefe
| 39859 ||  || — || February 17, 1998 || Kitt Peak || Spacewatch || ERI || align=right | 4.1 km || 
|-id=860 bgcolor=#fefefe
| 39860 Aiguoxiang ||  ||  || February 17, 1998 || Xinglong || SCAP || FLO || align=right | 1.4 km || 
|-id=861 bgcolor=#fefefe
| 39861 ||  || — || February 21, 1998 || Xinglong || SCAP || — || align=right | 2.0 km || 
|-id=862 bgcolor=#fefefe
| 39862 ||  || — || February 17, 1998 || Xinglong || SCAP || V || align=right | 1.6 km || 
|-id=863 bgcolor=#fefefe
| 39863 ||  || — || February 22, 1998 || Haleakala || NEAT || V || align=right | 3.5 km || 
|-id=864 bgcolor=#d6d6d6
| 39864 Poggiali ||  ||  || February 26, 1998 || Campo Catino || F. Mallia, M. Di Sora || EOS || align=right | 5.8 km || 
|-id=865 bgcolor=#d6d6d6
| 39865 ||  || — || February 22, 1998 || Kitt Peak || Spacewatch || KOR || align=right | 2.9 km || 
|-id=866 bgcolor=#fefefe
| 39866 ||  || — || February 17, 1998 || Nachi-Katsuura || Y. Shimizu, T. Urata || H || align=right | 1.9 km || 
|-id=867 bgcolor=#fefefe
| 39867 ||  || — || February 22, 1998 || Kitt Peak || Spacewatch || — || align=right | 1.8 km || 
|-id=868 bgcolor=#fefefe
| 39868 ||  || — || February 27, 1998 || Bédoin || P. Antonini || V || align=right | 1.5 km || 
|-id=869 bgcolor=#fefefe
| 39869 ||  || — || February 21, 1998 || Kitt Peak || Spacewatch || MAS || align=right | 3.0 km || 
|-id=870 bgcolor=#fefefe
| 39870 ||  || — || February 23, 1998 || Kitt Peak || Spacewatch || V || align=right | 1.4 km || 
|-id=871 bgcolor=#E9E9E9
| 39871 Lucagrazzini ||  ||  || February 27, 1998 || Cima Ekar || G. Forti, M. Tombelli || RAF || align=right | 3.6 km || 
|-id=872 bgcolor=#fefefe
| 39872 ||  || — || February 27, 1998 || La Silla || E. W. Elst || MAS || align=right | 2.5 km || 
|-id=873 bgcolor=#fefefe
| 39873 ||  || — || February 27, 1998 || La Silla || E. W. Elst || NYS || align=right | 4.4 km || 
|-id=874 bgcolor=#fefefe
| 39874 ||  || — || February 27, 1998 || La Silla || E. W. Elst || FLO || align=right | 4.0 km || 
|-id=875 bgcolor=#fefefe
| 39875 Matteolombardo ||  ||  || February 27, 1998 || Cima Ekar || G. Forti, M. Tombelli || — || align=right | 2.8 km || 
|-id=876 bgcolor=#fefefe
| 39876 ||  || — || February 27, 1998 || Haleakala || NEAT || NYS || align=right | 5.0 km || 
|-id=877 bgcolor=#fefefe
| 39877 Deverchére ||  ||  || March 1, 1998 || Caussols || ODAS || NYS || align=right | 1.7 km || 
|-id=878 bgcolor=#fefefe
| 39878 ||  || — || March 2, 1998 || Xinglong || SCAP || NYS || align=right | 1.6 km || 
|-id=879 bgcolor=#fefefe
| 39879 ||  || — || March 3, 1998 || Nachi-Katsuura || Y. Shimizu, T. Urata || V || align=right | 3.7 km || 
|-id=880 bgcolor=#fefefe
| 39880 Dobšinský ||  ||  || March 15, 1998 || Modra || P. Kolény, L. Kornoš || FLO || align=right | 1.9 km || 
|-id=881 bgcolor=#fefefe
| 39881 ||  || — || March 1, 1998 || La Silla || E. W. Elst || NYS || align=right | 2.7 km || 
|-id=882 bgcolor=#fefefe
| 39882 Edgarmitchell ||  ||  || March 1, 1998 || La Silla || E. W. Elst || — || align=right | 2.5 km || 
|-id=883 bgcolor=#fefefe
| 39883 ||  || — || March 1, 1998 || La Silla || E. W. Elst || NYS || align=right | 1.8 km || 
|-id=884 bgcolor=#fefefe
| 39884 ||  || — || March 1, 1998 || La Silla || E. W. Elst || — || align=right | 3.9 km || 
|-id=885 bgcolor=#fefefe
| 39885 ||  || — || March 1, 1998 || La Silla || E. W. Elst || — || align=right | 3.3 km || 
|-id=886 bgcolor=#d6d6d6
| 39886 ||  || — || March 1, 1998 || La Silla || E. W. Elst || EOS || align=right | 8.2 km || 
|-id=887 bgcolor=#fefefe
| 39887 ||  || — || March 1, 1998 || La Silla || E. W. Elst || NYS || align=right | 3.4 km || 
|-id=888 bgcolor=#fefefe
| 39888 ||  || — || March 3, 1998 || La Silla || E. W. Elst || NYS || align=right | 2.0 km || 
|-id=889 bgcolor=#fefefe
| 39889 || 1998 FG || — || March 17, 1998 || Woomera || F. B. Zoltowski || — || align=right | 2.8 km || 
|-id=890 bgcolor=#E9E9E9
| 39890 Bobstephens ||  ||  || March 23, 1998 || Ondřejov || P. Pravec || — || align=right | 1.8 km || 
|-id=891 bgcolor=#fefefe
| 39891 ||  || — || March 20, 1998 || Socorro || LINEAR || H || align=right | 1.7 km || 
|-id=892 bgcolor=#fefefe
| 39892 ||  || — || March 23, 1998 || Modra || A. Galád, A. Pravda || — || align=right | 3.4 km || 
|-id=893 bgcolor=#E9E9E9
| 39893 ||  || — || March 24, 1998 || Kleť || Kleť Obs. || — || align=right | 4.8 km || 
|-id=894 bgcolor=#fefefe
| 39894 ||  || — || March 26, 1998 || Haleakala || NEAT || FLO || align=right | 2.8 km || 
|-id=895 bgcolor=#fefefe
| 39895 ||  || — || March 28, 1998 || Farra d'Isonzo || Farra d'Isonzo || — || align=right | 2.3 km || 
|-id=896 bgcolor=#fefefe
| 39896 ||  || — || March 29, 1998 || Caussols || ODAS || — || align=right | 3.8 km || 
|-id=897 bgcolor=#fefefe
| 39897 ||  || — || March 20, 1998 || Socorro || LINEAR || — || align=right | 2.0 km || 
|-id=898 bgcolor=#fefefe
| 39898 ||  || — || March 20, 1998 || Socorro || LINEAR || MAS || align=right | 1.7 km || 
|-id=899 bgcolor=#fefefe
| 39899 ||  || — || March 20, 1998 || Socorro || LINEAR || — || align=right | 3.3 km || 
|-id=900 bgcolor=#fefefe
| 39900 ||  || — || March 20, 1998 || Socorro || LINEAR || NYS || align=right | 4.2 km || 
|}

39901–40000 

|-bgcolor=#fefefe
| 39901 ||  || — || March 20, 1998 || Socorro || LINEAR || NYS || align=right | 1.7 km || 
|-id=902 bgcolor=#fefefe
| 39902 ||  || — || March 20, 1998 || Socorro || LINEAR || ERI || align=right | 6.1 km || 
|-id=903 bgcolor=#fefefe
| 39903 ||  || — || March 20, 1998 || Socorro || LINEAR || NYS || align=right | 6.2 km || 
|-id=904 bgcolor=#fefefe
| 39904 ||  || — || March 20, 1998 || Socorro || LINEAR || — || align=right | 2.2 km || 
|-id=905 bgcolor=#fefefe
| 39905 ||  || — || March 20, 1998 || Socorro || LINEAR || — || align=right | 2.8 km || 
|-id=906 bgcolor=#fefefe
| 39906 ||  || — || March 20, 1998 || Socorro || LINEAR || — || align=right | 2.6 km || 
|-id=907 bgcolor=#fefefe
| 39907 ||  || — || March 20, 1998 || Socorro || LINEAR || V || align=right | 1.6 km || 
|-id=908 bgcolor=#fefefe
| 39908 ||  || — || March 20, 1998 || Socorro || LINEAR || — || align=right | 3.3 km || 
|-id=909 bgcolor=#fefefe
| 39909 ||  || — || March 20, 1998 || Socorro || LINEAR || — || align=right | 3.0 km || 
|-id=910 bgcolor=#E9E9E9
| 39910 ||  || — || March 20, 1998 || Socorro || LINEAR || MAR || align=right | 5.7 km || 
|-id=911 bgcolor=#fefefe
| 39911 ||  || — || March 20, 1998 || Socorro || LINEAR || V || align=right | 2.2 km || 
|-id=912 bgcolor=#fefefe
| 39912 ||  || — || March 20, 1998 || Socorro || LINEAR || — || align=right | 3.0 km || 
|-id=913 bgcolor=#fefefe
| 39913 ||  || — || March 20, 1998 || Socorro || LINEAR || MAS || align=right | 2.1 km || 
|-id=914 bgcolor=#fefefe
| 39914 ||  || — || March 20, 1998 || Socorro || LINEAR || NYS || align=right | 2.0 km || 
|-id=915 bgcolor=#fefefe
| 39915 ||  || — || March 20, 1998 || Socorro || LINEAR || MAS || align=right | 2.5 km || 
|-id=916 bgcolor=#fefefe
| 39916 ||  || — || March 20, 1998 || Socorro || LINEAR || — || align=right | 2.4 km || 
|-id=917 bgcolor=#fefefe
| 39917 ||  || — || March 20, 1998 || Socorro || LINEAR || — || align=right | 2.5 km || 
|-id=918 bgcolor=#fefefe
| 39918 ||  || — || March 20, 1998 || Socorro || LINEAR || NYS || align=right | 6.0 km || 
|-id=919 bgcolor=#fefefe
| 39919 ||  || — || March 20, 1998 || Socorro || LINEAR || NYS || align=right | 4.1 km || 
|-id=920 bgcolor=#fefefe
| 39920 ||  || — || March 20, 1998 || Socorro || LINEAR || — || align=right | 4.5 km || 
|-id=921 bgcolor=#fefefe
| 39921 ||  || — || March 20, 1998 || Socorro || LINEAR || — || align=right | 2.4 km || 
|-id=922 bgcolor=#E9E9E9
| 39922 ||  || — || March 20, 1998 || Socorro || LINEAR || — || align=right | 5.1 km || 
|-id=923 bgcolor=#fefefe
| 39923 ||  || — || March 20, 1998 || Socorro || LINEAR || V || align=right | 1.8 km || 
|-id=924 bgcolor=#fefefe
| 39924 ||  || — || March 20, 1998 || Socorro || LINEAR || — || align=right | 1.8 km || 
|-id=925 bgcolor=#fefefe
| 39925 ||  || — || March 20, 1998 || Socorro || LINEAR || — || align=right | 2.4 km || 
|-id=926 bgcolor=#fefefe
| 39926 ||  || — || March 20, 1998 || Socorro || LINEAR || — || align=right | 2.8 km || 
|-id=927 bgcolor=#fefefe
| 39927 ||  || — || March 20, 1998 || Socorro || LINEAR || V || align=right | 1.9 km || 
|-id=928 bgcolor=#fefefe
| 39928 ||  || — || March 20, 1998 || Socorro || LINEAR || — || align=right | 2.7 km || 
|-id=929 bgcolor=#fefefe
| 39929 ||  || — || March 20, 1998 || Socorro || LINEAR || NYS || align=right | 2.1 km || 
|-id=930 bgcolor=#fefefe
| 39930 Kalauch ||  ||  || March 24, 1998 || Drebach || G. Lehmann || EUT || align=right | 1.3 km || 
|-id=931 bgcolor=#fefefe
| 39931 ||  || — || March 24, 1998 || Socorro || LINEAR || — || align=right | 2.5 km || 
|-id=932 bgcolor=#fefefe
| 39932 ||  || — || March 24, 1998 || Socorro || LINEAR || V || align=right | 2.1 km || 
|-id=933 bgcolor=#fefefe
| 39933 ||  || — || March 24, 1998 || Socorro || LINEAR || — || align=right | 3.6 km || 
|-id=934 bgcolor=#fefefe
| 39934 ||  || — || March 24, 1998 || Socorro || LINEAR || — || align=right | 4.4 km || 
|-id=935 bgcolor=#E9E9E9
| 39935 ||  || — || March 24, 1998 || Socorro || LINEAR || EUN || align=right | 3.7 km || 
|-id=936 bgcolor=#fefefe
| 39936 ||  || — || March 24, 1998 || Socorro || LINEAR || — || align=right | 2.5 km || 
|-id=937 bgcolor=#fefefe
| 39937 ||  || — || March 31, 1998 || Socorro || LINEAR || V || align=right | 2.4 km || 
|-id=938 bgcolor=#fefefe
| 39938 ||  || — || March 31, 1998 || Socorro || LINEAR || — || align=right | 3.0 km || 
|-id=939 bgcolor=#fefefe
| 39939 ||  || — || March 31, 1998 || Socorro || LINEAR || — || align=right | 2.4 km || 
|-id=940 bgcolor=#fefefe
| 39940 ||  || — || March 31, 1998 || Socorro || LINEAR || — || align=right | 2.7 km || 
|-id=941 bgcolor=#E9E9E9
| 39941 ||  || — || March 31, 1998 || Socorro || LINEAR || — || align=right | 11 km || 
|-id=942 bgcolor=#fefefe
| 39942 ||  || — || March 31, 1998 || Socorro || LINEAR || — || align=right | 2.5 km || 
|-id=943 bgcolor=#fefefe
| 39943 ||  || — || March 31, 1998 || Socorro || LINEAR || V || align=right | 2.5 km || 
|-id=944 bgcolor=#E9E9E9
| 39944 ||  || — || March 31, 1998 || Socorro || LINEAR || — || align=right | 3.6 km || 
|-id=945 bgcolor=#E9E9E9
| 39945 ||  || — || March 31, 1998 || Socorro || LINEAR || ADE || align=right | 6.4 km || 
|-id=946 bgcolor=#fefefe
| 39946 ||  || — || March 31, 1998 || Socorro || LINEAR || PHO || align=right | 2.8 km || 
|-id=947 bgcolor=#E9E9E9
| 39947 ||  || — || March 31, 1998 || Socorro || LINEAR || — || align=right | 2.6 km || 
|-id=948 bgcolor=#fefefe
| 39948 ||  || — || March 31, 1998 || Socorro || LINEAR || — || align=right | 3.6 km || 
|-id=949 bgcolor=#fefefe
| 39949 ||  || — || March 31, 1998 || Socorro || LINEAR || V || align=right | 3.7 km || 
|-id=950 bgcolor=#E9E9E9
| 39950 ||  || — || March 31, 1998 || Socorro || LINEAR || — || align=right | 5.4 km || 
|-id=951 bgcolor=#fefefe
| 39951 ||  || — || March 31, 1998 || Socorro || LINEAR || V || align=right | 2.5 km || 
|-id=952 bgcolor=#E9E9E9
| 39952 ||  || — || March 31, 1998 || Socorro || LINEAR || — || align=right | 5.9 km || 
|-id=953 bgcolor=#fefefe
| 39953 ||  || — || March 31, 1998 || Socorro || LINEAR || — || align=right | 3.3 km || 
|-id=954 bgcolor=#fefefe
| 39954 ||  || — || March 31, 1998 || Socorro || LINEAR || — || align=right | 4.2 km || 
|-id=955 bgcolor=#fefefe
| 39955 ||  || — || March 31, 1998 || Socorro || LINEAR || SUL || align=right | 6.1 km || 
|-id=956 bgcolor=#fefefe
| 39956 ||  || — || March 20, 1998 || Socorro || LINEAR || — || align=right | 2.1 km || 
|-id=957 bgcolor=#fefefe
| 39957 ||  || — || March 20, 1998 || Socorro || LINEAR || — || align=right | 2.4 km || 
|-id=958 bgcolor=#fefefe
| 39958 ||  || — || March 20, 1998 || Socorro || LINEAR || NYS || align=right | 2.1 km || 
|-id=959 bgcolor=#fefefe
| 39959 ||  || — || March 20, 1998 || Socorro || LINEAR || — || align=right | 4.0 km || 
|-id=960 bgcolor=#fefefe
| 39960 ||  || — || March 20, 1998 || Socorro || LINEAR || — || align=right | 1.5 km || 
|-id=961 bgcolor=#E9E9E9
| 39961 ||  || — || March 20, 1998 || Socorro || LINEAR || — || align=right | 1.9 km || 
|-id=962 bgcolor=#fefefe
| 39962 ||  || — || March 24, 1998 || Socorro || LINEAR || PHO || align=right | 2.7 km || 
|-id=963 bgcolor=#fefefe
| 39963 ||  || — || March 20, 1998 || Socorro || LINEAR || — || align=right | 2.4 km || 
|-id=964 bgcolor=#fefefe
| 39964 ||  || — || March 28, 1998 || Socorro || LINEAR || V || align=right | 1.7 km || 
|-id=965 bgcolor=#E9E9E9
| 39965 ||  || — || March 28, 1998 || Socorro || LINEAR || — || align=right | 1.9 km || 
|-id=966 bgcolor=#E9E9E9
| 39966 ||  || — || March 29, 1998 || Socorro || LINEAR || — || align=right | 1.9 km || 
|-id=967 bgcolor=#E9E9E9
| 39967 || 1998 GE || — || April 2, 1998 || Socorro || LINEAR || BAR || align=right | 3.3 km || 
|-id=968 bgcolor=#fefefe
| 39968 ||  || — || April 2, 1998 || Socorro || LINEAR || CHL || align=right | 4.9 km || 
|-id=969 bgcolor=#fefefe
| 39969 ||  || — || April 2, 1998 || Socorro || LINEAR || — || align=right | 6.6 km || 
|-id=970 bgcolor=#fefefe
| 39970 ||  || — || April 2, 1998 || Socorro || LINEAR || — || align=right | 4.2 km || 
|-id=971 bgcolor=#E9E9E9
| 39971 József ||  ||  || April 2, 1998 || Piszkéstető || L. Kiss, K. Sárneczky || — || align=right | 2.1 km || 
|-id=972 bgcolor=#E9E9E9
| 39972 || 1998 HT || — || April 17, 1998 || Kitt Peak || Spacewatch || — || align=right | 5.1 km || 
|-id=973 bgcolor=#fefefe
| 39973 || 1998 HX || — || April 17, 1998 || Kitt Peak || Spacewatch || — || align=right | 4.5 km || 
|-id=974 bgcolor=#E9E9E9
| 39974 ||  || — || April 17, 1998 || Kitt Peak || Spacewatch || MAR || align=right | 3.2 km || 
|-id=975 bgcolor=#fefefe
| 39975 ||  || — || April 20, 1998 || Gekko || T. Kagawa || — || align=right | 2.9 km || 
|-id=976 bgcolor=#fefefe
| 39976 ||  || — || April 17, 1998 || Kitt Peak || Spacewatch || — || align=right | 2.6 km || 
|-id=977 bgcolor=#E9E9E9
| 39977 ||  || — || April 18, 1998 || Kitt Peak || Spacewatch || — || align=right | 4.0 km || 
|-id=978 bgcolor=#E9E9E9
| 39978 ||  || — || April 17, 1998 || Kitt Peak || Spacewatch || — || align=right | 3.3 km || 
|-id=979 bgcolor=#fefefe
| 39979 ||  || — || April 22, 1998 || Haleakala || NEAT || PHO || align=right | 5.4 km || 
|-id=980 bgcolor=#E9E9E9
| 39980 ||  || — || April 18, 1998 || Socorro || LINEAR || — || align=right | 2.5 km || 
|-id=981 bgcolor=#fefefe
| 39981 ||  || — || April 17, 1998 || Kitt Peak || Spacewatch || NYS || align=right | 4.0 km || 
|-id=982 bgcolor=#E9E9E9
| 39982 ||  || — || April 22, 1998 || Kitt Peak || Spacewatch || — || align=right | 2.7 km || 
|-id=983 bgcolor=#fefefe
| 39983 ||  || — || April 18, 1998 || Socorro || LINEAR || V || align=right | 1.9 km || 
|-id=984 bgcolor=#fefefe
| 39984 ||  || — || April 18, 1998 || Socorro || LINEAR || — || align=right | 2.5 km || 
|-id=985 bgcolor=#E9E9E9
| 39985 ||  || — || April 28, 1998 || Kitt Peak || Spacewatch || EUN || align=right | 2.4 km || 
|-id=986 bgcolor=#E9E9E9
| 39986 ||  || — || April 20, 1998 || Socorro || LINEAR || EUN || align=right | 3.6 km || 
|-id=987 bgcolor=#fefefe
| 39987 ||  || — || April 20, 1998 || Socorro || LINEAR || NYS || align=right | 1.8 km || 
|-id=988 bgcolor=#fefefe
| 39988 ||  || — || April 20, 1998 || Socorro || LINEAR || — || align=right | 4.6 km || 
|-id=989 bgcolor=#E9E9E9
| 39989 ||  || — || April 20, 1998 || Socorro || LINEAR || — || align=right | 3.1 km || 
|-id=990 bgcolor=#fefefe
| 39990 ||  || — || April 20, 1998 || Socorro || LINEAR || — || align=right | 2.6 km || 
|-id=991 bgcolor=#fefefe
| 39991 Iochroma ||  ||  || April 20, 1998 || Socorro || LINEAR || — || align=right | 3.8 km || 
|-id=992 bgcolor=#E9E9E9
| 39992 ||  || — || April 20, 1998 || Socorro || LINEAR || — || align=right | 3.3 km || 
|-id=993 bgcolor=#E9E9E9
| 39993 ||  || — || April 24, 1998 || Kitt Peak || Spacewatch || — || align=right | 2.3 km || 
|-id=994 bgcolor=#E9E9E9
| 39994 ||  || — || April 20, 1998 || Socorro || LINEAR || — || align=right | 2.6 km || 
|-id=995 bgcolor=#E9E9E9
| 39995 ||  || — || April 25, 1998 || Anderson Mesa || LONEOS || — || align=right | 8.3 km || 
|-id=996 bgcolor=#E9E9E9
| 39996 ||  || — || April 21, 1998 || Socorro || LINEAR || — || align=right | 2.2 km || 
|-id=997 bgcolor=#d6d6d6
| 39997 ||  || — || April 21, 1998 || Socorro || LINEAR || — || align=right | 5.0 km || 
|-id=998 bgcolor=#fefefe
| 39998 ||  || — || April 21, 1998 || Socorro || LINEAR || — || align=right | 2.4 km || 
|-id=999 bgcolor=#fefefe
| 39999 ||  || — || April 21, 1998 || Socorro || LINEAR || V || align=right | 1.7 km || 
|-id=000 bgcolor=#E9E9E9
| 40000 ||  || — || April 21, 1998 || Socorro || LINEAR || MAR || align=right | 2.6 km || 
|}

References

External links 
 Discovery Circumstances: Numbered Minor Planets (35001)–(40000) (IAU Minor Planet Center)

0039